= Monochromacy =

Type of color vision

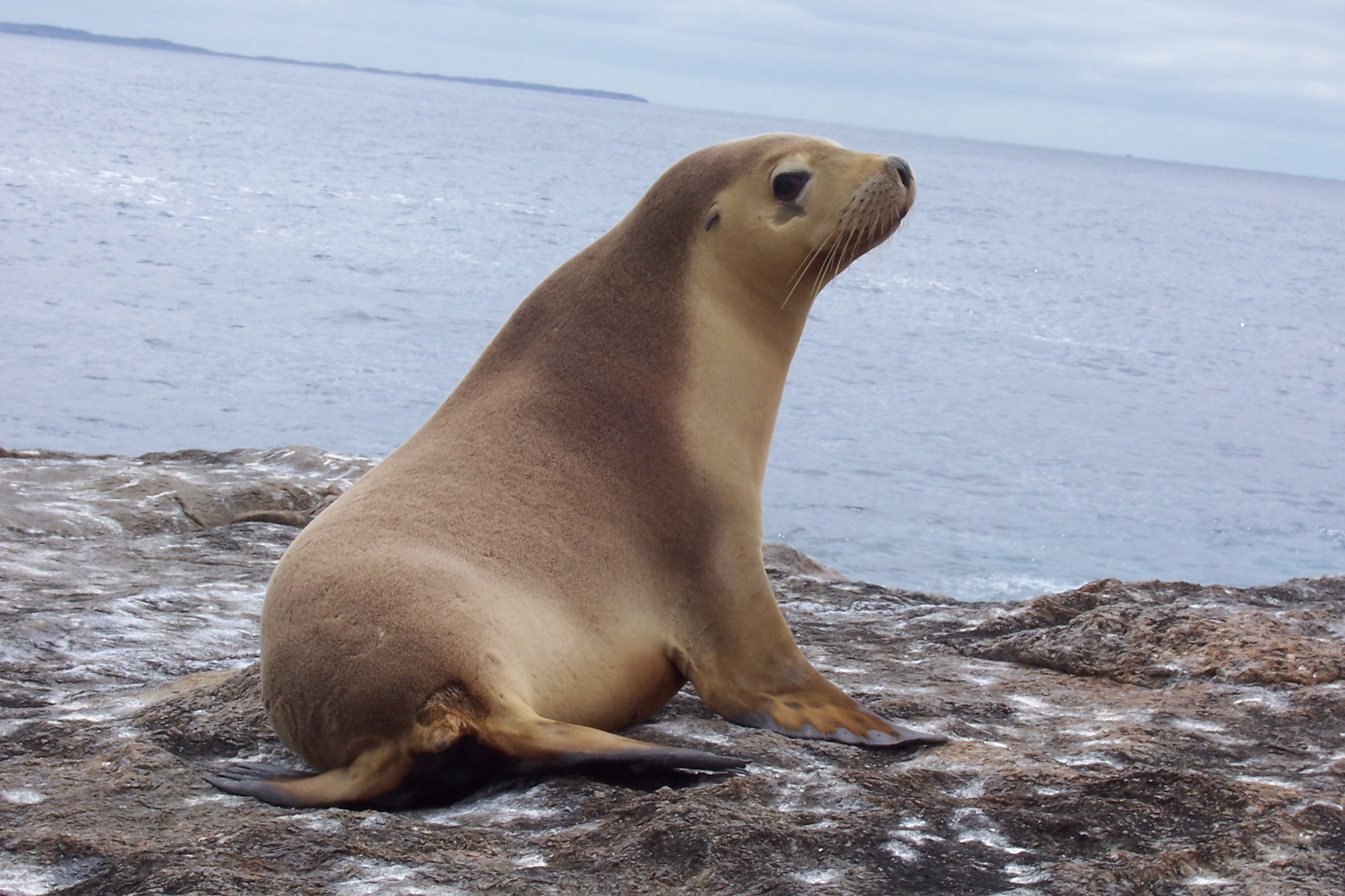
- Monochromacy is a disease state in human vision but is normal in pinnipeds (such as Neophoca cinerea shown here), cetaceans, owl monkeys and some other animals.
- Specialty: Ophthalmology

Monochromacy (from Greek mono, meaning "one" and chromo, meaning "color") is the ability of organisms to perceive only light intensity without respect to spectral composition. Organisms with monochromacy lack color vision and can only see in shades of grey ranging from black to white. Organisms with monochromacy are called monochromats. Many mammals, such as cetaceans, the owl monkey and the Australian sea lion are monochromats. In humans, monochromacy is one among several other symptoms of severe inherited or acquired diseases, including achromatopsia or blue cone monochromacy, together affecting about 1 in 30,000 people.

== Humans ==
Human vision relies on a duplex retina, comprising two types of photoreceptor cells. Rods are primarily responsible for dim-light scotopic vision and cones are primarily responsible for day-light photopic vision. For all known vertebrates, scotopic vision is monochromatic, since there is typically only one class of rod cell. However, the presence of multiple cone classes contributing to photopic vision enables color vision during daytime conditions.

Most humans have three classes of cones, each with a different class of opsin. These three opsins have different spectral sensitivities, which is a prerequisite for trichromacy. An alteration of any of these three cone opsins can lead to colorblindness.

1. Anomalous trichromacy, when all three cones are functional, but one or more is altered in its spectral sensitivity.
2. Dichromacy, when one of the cones is non-functional and one of the red-green or blue-yellow opponent channels are fully disabled.
3. Cone monochromacy, when two of the cones are non-functional and both chromatic opponent channels are disabled. Vision is reduced to blacks, whites, and greys.
4. Rod monochromacy (Achromatopsia), when all three of the cones are non-functional and therefore photopic vision (and therefore color vision) is disabled.

Monochromacy of photopic vision is a symptom of both cone monochromacy and rod monochromacy, so these two conditions are typically referred to collectively as monochromacy.

=== Rod monochromacy ===
Rod monochromacy (RM), also called congenital complete achromatopsia or total color blindness, is a rare and extremely severe form of an autosomal recessively inherited retinal disorder resulting in severe visual impairment. People with RM have a reduced visual acuity, (usually about 0.1 or 20/200), have total color blindness, photo-aversion and nystagmus. The nystagmus and photo-aversion usually are present during the first months of life, and the prevalence of the disease is estimated to be 1 in 30,000 worldwide. Since patients with RM have no cone function, they lack photopic vision, relying entirely on their rods and scotopic vision, which is necessarily monochromatic. They therefore cannot see any color but only shades of grey.

=== Cone monochromacy ===
Cone monochromacy (CM) is a condition defined by the exhibition of only one class of cones. A cone monochromat can have good pattern vision at normal daylight levels, but will not be able to distinguish hues.

As humans typically exhibit three classes of cones, cone monochromats can hypothetically derive their photopic vision from any one of them, leading to three categories of cone monochromats:

1. Blue cone monochromacy (BCM), also known as S-cone monochromacy, is an X-linked cone disease. It is a rare congenital stationary cone dysfunction syndrome, affecting less than 1 in 100,000 individuals, and is characterized by the absence of L- and M-cone function. BCM results from mutations in a single red or red–green hybrid opsin gene, mutations in both the red and the green opsin genes or deletions within the adjacent LCR (locus control region) on the X chromosome.
2. Green cone monochromacy (GCM), also known as M-cone monochromacy, is a condition where the blue and red cones are absent in the fovea. The prevalence of this type of monochromacy is estimated to be less than 1 in 1 million.
3. Red cone monochromacy (RCM), also known as L-cone monochromacy, is a condition where the blue and green cones are absent in the fovea. Like GCM, the prevalence of RCM is also estimated at less than 1 in 1 million.

Cone monochromats with normal rod function can sometimes exhibit mild color vision due to conditional dichromacy. In mesopic conditions, both rods and cones are active and opponent interactions between the cones and rods can afford slight color vision.

According to Jay Neitz, a color vision researcher at the University of Washington, each of the three standard color-detecting cones in the retina of trichromats can detect approximately 100 gradations of color. The brain can process the combinations of these three values so that the average human can distinguish about one million colors. Therefore, a monochromat would be able to distinguish about 100 colors.

== Diagnosis ==
Early diagnosis is important for people with monochromacy in order for them to get support and learn how to manage the condition. First steps for diagnosing monochromacy include color vision tests to see how the patient perceives color, electroretinography, which measures electrical activity in the retina when exposed to light, and genetic testing.

== Mammals ==
Until the 1960s, popular belief held that most mammals outside of primates were monochromats. In the last half-century, however, a focus on behavioral and genetic testing of mammals has accumulated extensive evidence of at least dichromatic color vision in a number of mammalian orders. Mammals are now usually assumed to be dichromats (possessing S- and L-cones), with monochromats viewed as the exceptions.

Two mammalian orders containing marine mammals exhibit monochromatic vision:

- Pinnipeds (including seals, sea lions and walruses)
- Cetaceans (including dolphins and whales)

Unlike the trichromacy exhibited in most primates, owl monkeys (genus Aotus) are also monochromats. Several members of the family Procyonidae (raccoon, crab-eating raccoon and kinkajou) and a few rodents have been demonstrated as cone monochromats, having lost functionality of the S-cone (retaining the L-cone).

The light available in an animal's habitat is a significant determiner of a mammal's color vision. Marine, nocturnal or burrowing mammals, which experience less light, have less evolutionary pressure to preserve dichromacy, so often evolve monochromacy.

A 2014 study using through PCR analysis of genes OPN1SW, OPN1LW, and PDE6C determined that all mammals in the cohort Xenarthra (sloths, anteaters and armadillos) inherited rod monochromacy from a common ancestor.

== Kinds of Color Blindness ==
Trichromacy is another term for normal vision in humans. There are three different types of anomalous trichromacy: protanomaly, deuteranomaly, and tritanomaly. These can affect people at different levels.

Dichromacy is a term for someone who is missing one type of cone cell.

== See also ==
- Achromatopsia
- Blue cone monochromacy
- Cone dystrophy
- Dichromacy
- Trichromacy
- Tetrachromacy
