= Duplex retina =

Retina consisting of rod cells and cone cells

The distribution of human photoreceptor cells shows how the photopic and scotopic systems exist in parallel, except in the fovea where the photopic system dominates.

A duplex retina is a retina consisting of both rod cells and cone cells, which are the photoreceptor cells for two parallel but mostly separate visual systems. The rods enable the scotopic visual system, which is active in dim light. The cones enable the photopic visual system, which is active in bright light. While one is active, the other is generally inactive; either the rods are photobleached, or oversaturated, in bright light, or the cones are not sensitive enough to hyperpolarize, or instigate the phototransduction cascade, in dim light. However, at mesopic (twilight) conditions, both visual systems are active. In this region of overlap, both systems are active and combine to contribute to mesopic vision.

== Advantages ==
Like all sensors, photoreceptors are limited in dynamic range, i.e. the ratio between the lowest and highest signal they can detect. Having two photoreceptors of differing sensitivities can together cover more dynamic range of light. Human rods can detect 7 orders of magnitude between their minimum threshold and saturation and cones can detect 11 orders of magnitude between their minimum threshold and point of damage. However, together, considering their overlap, a human duplex retina can detect 14 orders of magnitude.

For any visual system, there is a tradeoff between sensitivity and spatial/temporal acuity. A duplex retina uses two visual systems, one of which trades acuity for sensitivity (scotopic), and the other which trades sensitivity for high spatial and temporal acuity (photopic), which gives the best of both worlds.

== Simplex retina ==
Most vertebrates exhibit duplex retinas, including all major classes: mammals, birds, reptiles, bony fish, etc. However, some sub-clades will have evolved from the common vertebrate ancestor to lose one of the visual systems and develop a simplex retina, often called a pure-rod or pure-cone retina. Vertebrates that have lost their cone cells and exhibit a pure-rod retina include:

- Almost 90% of deep-sea fish species are rod monochromats.
- Xenarthra (armadillos, anteaters, and tree sloths)

Many vertebrates have lost their rod cells and exhibit a pure-cone retinas, which include:

- most diurnal lizards
- some colubrid snakes
- ground squirrels were long considered to lack rod cells, but only part of the population lacks functional scotopic vision despite possessing rod cells.

While most humans possess duplex retinas, some conditions lead to a failure of one of the visual systems. A human lacking cone cells and therefore a photopic system is called an achromat or rod monochromat and experiences day blindness and monochromacy. A human lacking rod cells and therefore a scotopic system has nyctalopia or night blindness.

== See also ==
- Mesopic vision
- Purkinje effect
