= Blue-cone monochromacy =

Blue cone monochromacy
- Other names: X-linked achromatopsia
- Specialty: Ophthalmology
- Symptoms: poor ability or inability to distinguish colors, poor visual acuity, nystagmus, hemeralopia
- Usual onset: congenital
- Differential diagnosis: incomplete achromatopsia
- Treatment: dark lenses
- Frequency: 1 in 100,000

Blue cone monochromacy (BCM) is an inherited eye disease that causes severe color blindness, poor visual acuity, nystagmus, hemeralopia, and photophobia due to the absence of functional red (L) and green (M) cone photoreceptor cells in the retina. BCM is a recessive X-linked disease and almost exclusively affects males.

== Signs and symptoms ==
A variety of symptoms characterize BCM:

- Low visual acuity - ranging between 20/60 and 20/200
- Poor ability or inability to distinguish colors
- Hemeralopia (and associated photophobia) - sensitivity to bright light
- Nystagmus - an involuntary eye movement.

BCM symptoms are usually stationary, but some studies show evidence of disease progression.

=== Poor color discrimination ===
The color vision of blue cone monochromats is severely impaired. However, interaction of the blue cones and rod photoreceptors in mesopic vision (twilight) may enable some level of dichromacy.

== Cause ==
Cone cells are one kind of photoreceptor cell in the retina that are responsible for the photopic visual system and mediate color vision. The cones are categorized according to their spectral sensitivity:

- LWS (long wave sensitive) cones are most sensitive to red light.
- MWS (middle wave sensitive) cones are most sensitive to green light.
- SWS (short wave sensitive) cones are most sensitive to blue light.

MWS and LWS cones are most responsible for visual acuity as they are concentrated in the fovea centralis region of the retina, which constitutes the very center of the visual field. Blue cone monochromacy is a severe condition in which the cones sensitive to red or green light are missing or defective, and only S-cones sensitive to blue light and rods which are responsible for night (scotopic) vision are functional.

== Genetics ==
=== Heredity ===
Because blue cone monochromacy shares many symptoms with achromatopsia, it was historically treated as a subset of achromatopsia, called x-linked achromatopsia or atypical incomplete achromatopsia. Both of these names differentiated BCM specifically by how its inheritance pattern deviated from other forms of achromatopsia. While other forms (ACHM) follow autosomal inheritance, BCM is X-Linked. Once the molecular biological basis of BCM was understood, the more descriptive term Blue cone monochromacy became dominant in the literature.

=== Genes ===
The gene cluster responsible for BCM comprises 3 genes and is located at position Xq28, at the end of the q arm of the X chromosome. The genes in the cluster are summarized in the following table:

Type	OMIM	Gene	Locus	Purpose
Locus Control Region	300824	LCR	Xq28	Acts as a promoter of the expression of the two opsin genes thereafter, and ensures that only one of the two opsins (LWS or MWS) is expressed exclusively in each cone.
LWS opsin	300822	OPN1LW	Xq28	Encodes the LWS (red) photopsin protein.
MWS opsin	300821	OPN1MW	Xq28	Encodes the MWS (green) photopsin protein.

Originating from a recent duplication event, the two opsins are highly homologous (very similar), having only 19 dimorphic sites (amino acids that differ), and are therefore 96% similar. Furthermore, only 7 of these dimorphic sites lead to a functional difference between the genes, i.e. that tune the opsin's spectral sensitivity. In comparison, these opsin genes are only 40% homologous (similar) to OPN1SW (encoding the SWS photopsin and located on chromosome 7) and "RHO" (encoding rhodopsin, and located on chromosome 3). OPN1SW and rhodopsin are unaffected in BCM.

=== Mutations ===
Since BCM is caused by non-functional M- and L-cones, it can result from the intersection of protanopia (no functional L-cones) and deuteranopia (no functional M-cones). Therefore the genetic causes of BCM include the genetic causes of protanopia and deuteranopia. These include (affecting either opsin gene):

- deletions of the opsin genes, often from nonhomologous recombination.
- point mutations that lead to non-functional (inactivated) opsins:
  - C203R: a missense mutation.
  - P307L
  - R247X: a nonsense mutation.
- intragenic deletion of whole exon 4
- LIAVA genotype: inactivation through homologous recombination that ends with Exon 3 of the hybrid opsin gene containing the following amino acids in the positions indicated: 153 Leucine, 171 Isoleucine, 174 Alanine, 178 Valine and 180 Alanine.

Data from the BCM International Patient Registry shows that about 35% of Blue cone monochromacy stems from this 2-step process, where both genes are each affected by one of the above mutations. The remaining 55% of Blue cone monochromats are caused by a deletion of the LCR. In the absence of LCR, neither of the following two opsin genes are expressed.

Another disease of the retina that is associated with the position Xq28 is Bornholm Eye Disease (BED). The point mutation W177R is a missense mutation that causes cone dystrophy when present on both opsin genes.

== Diagnosis ==
Children 2 months and older can be identified as possible blue cone monochromats from observing an aversion to light and/or nystagmus, but are not sufficient for diagnosis, and especially not the differential diagnosis with achromatopsia. The differential diagnosis can be achieved in a few ways:

- through reconstructing the family history to establish an X-linked mode of heredity
- with an electroretinogram (ERG), which measures the electrical response of photoreceptors to a visual stimulus of known wavelength. This can demonstrate the loss of function of the LWS and MWS cones.
- with a color vision test, either general in nature like the Farnsworth D-15 or Farnsworth Munsell 100 Hue test or the Berson test, which is specifically designed to differentiate BCM from typical achromatopsia.

== Treatment ==
Corrective visual aides and personalized vision therapy provided by Low Vision Specialists may help patients correct glare and optimize their remaining visual acuity. Tinted lenses for photophobia allow for greater visual comfort. A magenta (mixture of red and blue) tint allows for best visual acuity since it protects the rods from saturation while allowing the blue cones to be maximally stimulated.

=== Gene therapy ===
There is no cure for blue cone monochromacy. However, there are prospective gene therapy treatments which are currently being evaluated for safety and efficacy. Gene therapy is a general treatment for genetic disorders; it uses viral vectors to carry typical genes into cells (e.g. cone cells) that are not able to express functional genes (e.g. photopsins). It may be possible to restore color vision by adding missing opsin genes – or a functional copy of the entire gene complex – into the cone cells. In 2015, a team at the University of Pennsylvania evaluated possible outcome measures of BCM gene therapy. Since 2011, several studies have performed gene therapy for BCM on mouse and rat models.

== Epidemiology ==
BCM affects approximately 1/100,000 individuals. The disease affects males much more than females due to its recessive X-linked nature, while females usually remain unaffected carriers of the BCM trait.

== History ==
Prior to the 1960s, blue cone monochromacy was treated as a subset of achromatopsia. The first detailed description of achromatopsia was given in 1777, where the subject of the description:

...could never do more than guess the name of any color; yet he could distinguish white from black, or black from any light or bright color...He had 2 brothers in the same circumstances as to sight; and 2 brothers and sisters who, as well as his parents, had nothing of this defect.

— J. Huddart, "An account of persons who could not distinguish colours", Philos. Trans. R. Soc: 67 (1777)

In 1942, Sloan first distinguished typical and atypical achromatopsia, differentiated mainly on the inheritance patterns. In 1953, Weale theorized that the atypical achromatopsia must stem from cone-monochromatism, but estimated a prevalence of only 1 in 100 million. In the early 1960s, the inheritance of atypical achromatopsia led to a name change to x-linked achromatopsia, and at the same time, several studies demonstrated that Blue cone monochromats retain some Blue yellow color vision. A significant discovery was announced in 1989 (and 1993) by Nathans et al. who identified the genes which cause Blue cone monochromacy.
