= Darkness =

Lack of light

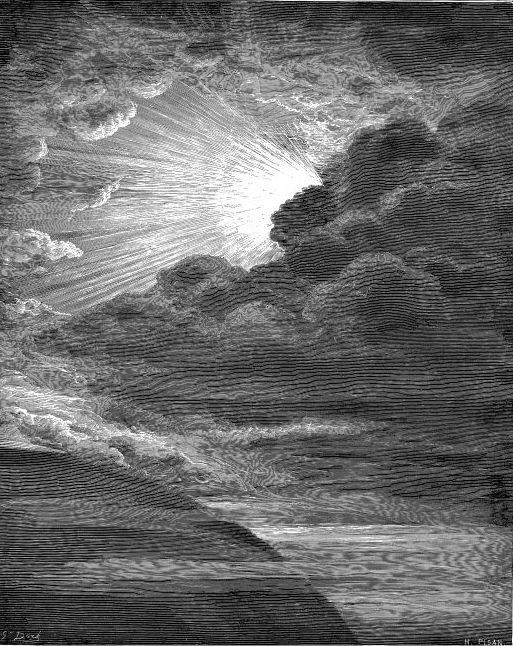
The Creation of Light by Gustave Doré

Darkness is the condition resulting from a lack of illumination, or an absence of visible light.

Under low light conditions, human vision becomes monochrome, a phenomenon termed scotopic vision. The lack of color comes from inactivity of cone cells, the type of photoreceptor cell on the retina that is responsible for the perception of color, but less sensitive to light than the rod cells. Scotopic vision takes place when luminance levels drops below the sensitivity threshold of cone cells; the other two type - mesopic and photopic vision - refers to vision under intermediate and normal lighting conditions.

The emotional response to darkness has led to metaphorical usages of the term in many cultures, often to convey feelings of unhappiness or foreboding.

"Darkness" may also refer to night, which occurs when the Sun is more than 18° below the horizon.

== Scientific ==
=== Perception ===
The perception of darkness differs from the mere absence of light that sometimes lead to afterimages. In perceiving, the eye is active, and the part of the retina that is unstimulated produces a complementary afterimage.

=== Physics ===
In terms of physics, an object is said to be dark when it absorbs photons, causing it to appear dim compared to other objects. For example, matte black paint does not reflect much visible light and appears dark, whereas white paint reflects much light and appears bright. For more information, see color. An object may appear dark, but it may be bright at a frequency that humans cannot perceive.

A dark area has limited light sources, making things hard to see. Exposure to alternating light and darkness (night and day) has caused several evolutionary adaptations to darkness. When a vertebrate, like a human, enters a dark area, its pupils dilate, allowing more light to enter the eye and improving night vision. Also, the light detecting cells in the human eye (rods and cones) will regenerate more unbleached rhodopsin when adapting to darkness.

One scientific measure of darkness is the Bortle scale, which indicates the night sky's and stars' brightness at a particular location, and the observability of celestial objects at that location.

The material known as Vantablack is one of the darkest substances known, absorbing up to 99.965% of visible light (at 663 nm if the light is perpendicular to the material), and was developed by Surrey NanoSystems in the United Kingdom. The name is a compound of the acronym VANTA (vertically aligned nanotube arrays) and the word black.

=== Technical ===
The color of a point, on a standard 24-bit computer display, is defined by three RGB (red, green, blue) values, each ranging from 0–255. When the red, green, and blue components of a pixel are fully illuminated (255,255,255), the pixel appears white; when all three components are unilluminated (0,0,0), the pixel appears black.

== Cultural ==
=== Artistic ===
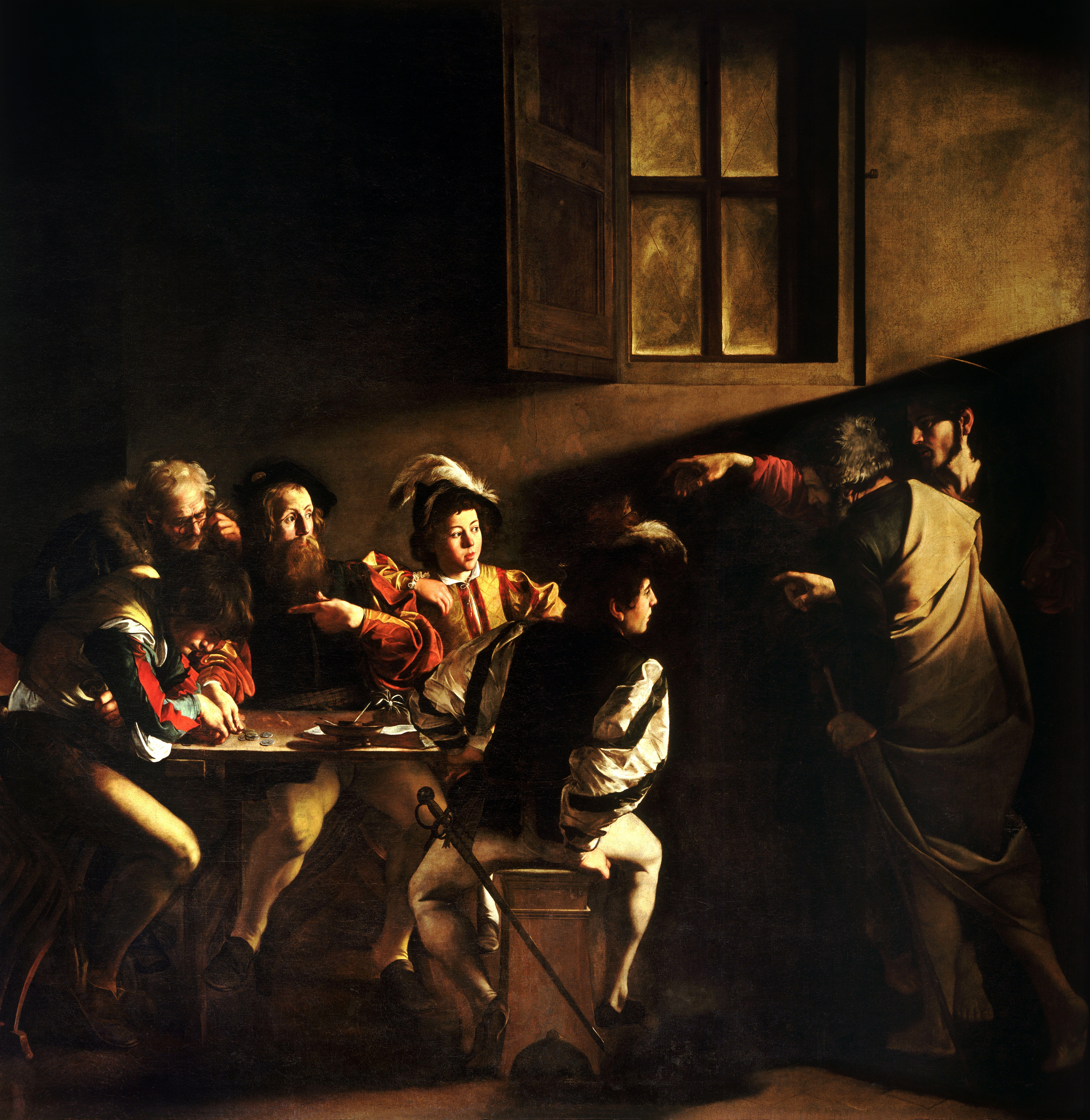
Caravaggio's The Calling of St Matthew uses darkness for its chiaroscuro effects.

Artists use darkness to emphasize and contrast the presence of light. Darkness can be used as a counterpoint to areas of lightness to create leading lines and voids. Such shapes draw the eye around areas of the painting. Shadows add depth and perspective to a painting.

Color paints are mixed together to create darkness, because each color absorbs certain frequencies of light. Theoretically, mixing together the three primary colors, or the three secondary colors, will absorb all visible light and create black. In practice, it is difficult to prevent the mixture from taking on a brown tint.

=== Literature ===
As a poetic term in the Western world, darkness is used to connote the presence of shadows, evil, and foreboding, or in modern parlance, to connote that a story is grim, heavy, and/or depressing.

==== Religion ====
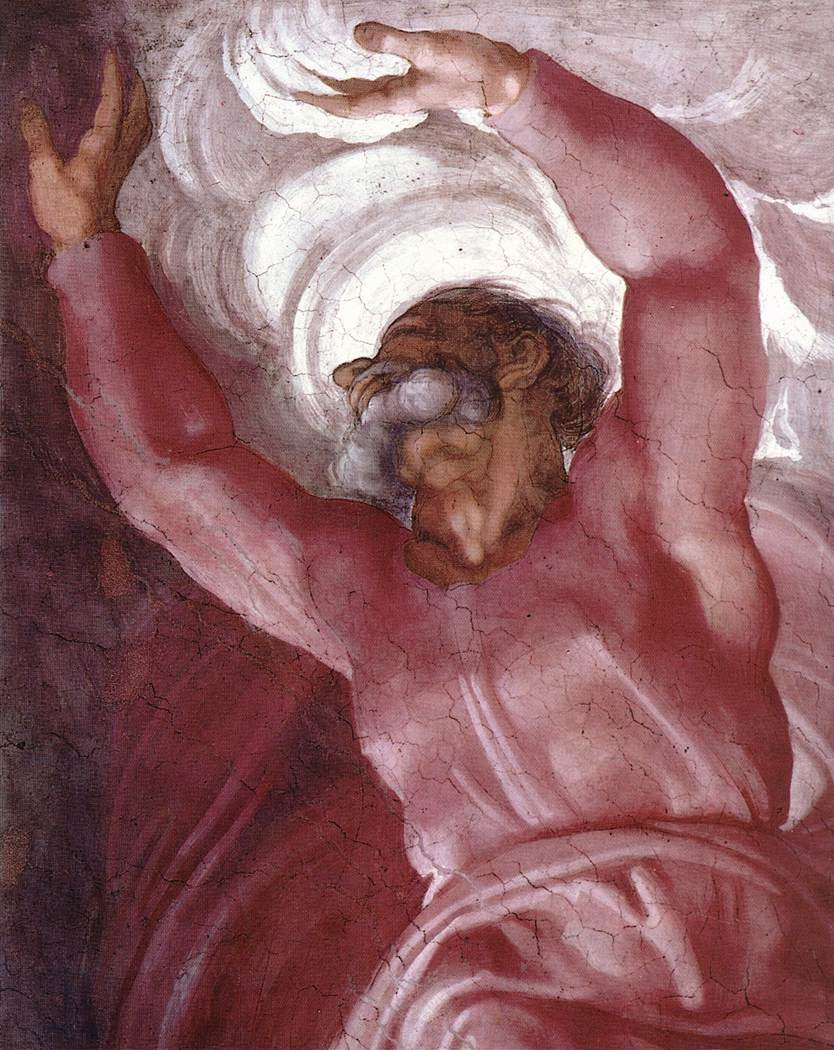
Separation of light and darkness on the first day of creation, from the Sistine Chapel ceiling by Michelangelo

The concept of light and darkness holds profound symbolic and theological significance across various religious traditions, serving as metaphors for creation, morality, and the nature of existence.

In the Judeo-Christian tradition, the first creation narrative begins with a void, described as "formless and empty," over which "darkness was over the surface of the deep" (Genesis 1:2). Into this void, God introduces light, declaring, "Let there be light" (Genesis 1:3), and separates this light from the darkness. This initial act of creation is distinct from the later creation of celestial bodies—the sun and moon—on the fourth day.

The symbolism of darkness and light in these traditions extends beyond the physical. Light is often associated with divine presence, knowledge, and goodness, while darkness symbolizes ignorance, separation from God, and sin. For example, in Exodus 10:21, darkness is described as "the second-to-last plague" inflicted upon Egypt, representing both physical and spiritual blindness. Similarly, in the New Testament, Jesus frequently contrasts light and darkness in his teachings. Darkness is the "outer realm" where there is "weeping and gnashing of teeth" (Matthew 8:12), symbolizing eternal separation from God.

In Islam, light (nūr) and darkness (ẓulumāt) are frequently invoked in both physical and spiritual contexts, reflecting profound moral and theological truths. The Quran begins its account of creation with Allah (or God) making the heavens and the earth and then creating "the darknesses and the light" (Quran 6:1). However, unlike some traditions where darkness is portrayed as inherently evil or chaotic, Islam emphasizes that both are under Allah's divine will and serve His purposes.

Light in the Quran often represents guidance, faith, and divine revelation, while darkness symbolizes misguidance, disbelief, and moral corruption. For instance, believers are often described as being "brought out from darkness into light" (Quran 2:257), a metaphor for their journey from ignorance to divine knowledge. This dichotomy underscores the moral framework of Islam, where both light and darkness are tools through which Allah tests and guides humanity.

In ancient Greek mythology, Erebus was a primordial deity representing the personification of darkness, particularly associated with the shadowy realm of death and the underworld. In Greek cosmology, darkness was often linked to the afterlife, where souls journeyed into the depths of the underworld, a place of shadow and obscurity.

Darkness in Greek cosmology was not merely an absence of light but a distinct and active force. The underworld, ruled by Hades, was a place of obscurity and shadow, reflecting the ambiguous fate of the human soul after death. In this tradition, darkness often signified the unknown and the eternal, as well as the boundaries between life and the afterlife.

==== Philosophy ====
In Chinese philosophy, yin is the complementary feminine part of the taijitu and is represented by a dark lobe.

==== Poetry ====
The use of darkness as a rhetorical device has a long-standing tradition. William Shakespeare, working in the 16th and 17th centuries, made a character called the "prince of darkness" (King Lear: III, iv) and gave darkness jaws with which to devour love. (A Midsummer Night's Dream: I, i) Geoffrey Chaucer, a 14th-century Middle English writer of The Canterbury Tales, wrote that knights must cast away the "workes of darkness". In Divine Comedy, Dante described hell as "solid darkness stain'd".

==== Language ====
In Old English there were three words that could mean darkness: heolstor, genip, and sceadu. Heolstor also meant "hiding-place" and became holster. Genip meant "mist" and fell out of use like many strong verbs. It is however still used in the Dutch saying "in het geniep" which means secretly. Sceadu meant "shadow" and remained in use. The word dark eventually evolved from the word deorc.

== See also ==
- Lightness
- Nyctophobia
- Scotobiology
- Shadow
- Theory of colours
