= Visual modularity =

In cognitive neuroscience, visual modularity is an organizational concept concerning how vision works. The way in which the primate visual system operates is currently under intense scientific scrutiny. One dominant thesis is that different properties of the visual world (color, motion, form and so forth) require different computational solutions which are implemented in anatomically/functionally distinct regions that operate independently – that is, in a modular fashion.

== Motion processing ==
Akinetopsia, a term coined by Semir Zeki, refers to an intriguing condition brought about by damage to the Extrastriate cortex MT+ (also known as area V5) that renders humans and monkeys unable to perceive motion, seeing the world in a series of static "frames" instead and indicates that there might be a "motion centre" in the brain. Of course, such data can only indicate that this area is at least necessary to motion perception, not that it is sufficient; however, other evidence has shown the importance of this area to primate motion perception. Specifically, physiological, neuroimaging, perceptual, electrical- and transcranial magnetic stimulation evidence (Table 1) all come together on the area V5/hMT+. Converging evidence of this type is supportive of a module for motion processing. However, this view is likely to be incomplete: other areas are involved with motion perception, including V1, V2 and V3a and areas surrounding V5/hMT+ (Table 2). A recent fMRI study put the number of motion areas at twenty-one. Clearly, this constitutes a stream of diverse anatomical areas. The extent to which this is 'pure' is in question: with Akinetopsia come severe difficulties in obtaining structure from motion. V5/hMT+ has since been implicated in this function as well as determining depth. Thus the current evidence suggests that motion processing occurs in a modular stream, although with a role in form and depth perception at higher levels.

Evidence for a "motion centre" in the primate brain
Methodology	Finding	Source
Physiology (single cell recording)	Cells directionally and speed selective in MT/V5	
Neuroimaging	Greater activation for motion information than static information in V5/MT	
Electrical-stimulation & perceptual	Following electrical stimulation of V5/MT cells perceptual decisions are biased towards the stimulated neuron's direction preference	
Magnetic-stimulation	Motion perception is also briefly impaired in humans by a strong magnetic pulse over the corresponding scalp region to hMT+	
Psychophysics	Perceptual asynchrony among motion, color and orientation.	

Evidence for a motion processing area surrounding V5
Methodology	Finding	Source
Physiology (single cell recording)	Complex motion involving contraction/expansion and rotation found to activate neurons in medial superior temporal area (MST)	
Neuroimaging	Biological motion activated superior temporal sulcus	
Neuroimaging	Tool use activated middle temporal gyrus and inferior temporal sulcus	
Neuropsychology	Damage to visual area V5 results in akinetopsia	

== Color processing ==
Similar converging evidence suggests modularity for color. Beginning with Gowers' finding that damage to the fusiform/lingual gyri in occipitotemporal cortex correlates with a loss in color perception (achromatopsia), the notion of a "color centre" in the primate brain has had growing support. Again, such clinical evidence only implies that this region is critical to color perception, and nothing more. Other evidence, however, including neuroimaging and physiology converges on V4 as necessary to color perception. A recent meta-analysis has also shown a specific lesion common to achromats corresponding to V4. From another direction altogether it has been found that when synaesthetes experience color by a non-visual stimulus, V4 is active. On the basis of this evidence it would seem that color processing is modular. However, as with motion processing it is likely that this conclusion is inaccurate. Other evidence shown in Table 3 implies different areas' involvement with color. It may thus be more instructive to consider a multistage color processing stream from the retina through to cortical areas including at least V1, V2, V4, PITd and TEO. Consonant with motion perception, there appears to be a constellation of areas drawn upon for color perception. In addition, V4 may have a special, but not exclusive, role. For example, single cell recording has shown that only V4 cells respond to the color of a stimuli rather than its waveband, whereas other areas involved with color do not.

Evidence against a "color center" in the primate brain
Other areas involved with color/Other functions of V4	Source
Wavelength sensitive cells in V1 and V2	
anterior parts of the inferior temporal cortex	
posterior parts of the superior temporal sulcus (PITd)	
Area in or near TEO	
Shape detection	
Link between vision, attention and cognition	

== Form processing ==
Another clinical case that would a priori suggest a module for modularity in visual processing is visual agnosia. The well studied patient DF is unable to recognize or discriminate objects owing to damage in areas of the lateral occipital cortex although she can see scenes without problem – she can literally see the forest but not the trees. Neuroimaging of intact individuals reveals strong occipito-temporal activation during object presentation and greater activation still for object recognition. Of course, such activation could be due to other processes, such as visual attention. However, other evidence that shows a tight coupling of perceptual and physiological changes suggests activation in this area does underpin object recognition. Within these regions are more specialized areas for face or fine grained analysis, place perception and human body perception. Perhaps some of the strongest evidence for the modular nature of these processing systems is the double dissociation between object- and face (prosop-) agnosia. However, as with color and motion, early areas (see for a comprehensive review) are implicated too, lending support to the idea of a multistage stream terminating in the inferotemporal cortex rather than an isolated module.

== Functional modularity ==
One of the first uses of the term "module" or "modularity" occurs in the influential book "Modularity of Mind" by philosopher Jerry Fodor. A detailed application of this idea to the case of vision was published by Pylyshyn (1999), who argued that there is a significant part of vision that is not responsive to beliefs and is "cognitively impenetrable".

Much of the confusion concerning modularity exists in neuroscience because there is evidence for specific areas (e.g. V4 or V5/hMT+) and the concomitant behavioral deficits following brain insult (thus taken as evidence for modularity). In addition, evidence shows other areas are involved and that these areas subserve processing of multiple properties (e.g. V1) (thus taken as evidence against modularity). That these streams have the same implementation in early visual areas, like V1, is not inconsistent with a modular viewpoint: to adopt the canonical analogy in cognition, it is possible for different software to run on the same hardware. A consideration of psychophysics and neuropsychological data would suggest support for this. For example, psychophysics has shown that percepts for different properties are realized asynchronously. In addition, although achromats experience other cognitive defects they do not have motion deficits when their lesion is restricted to V4, or total loss of form perception. Relatedly, Zihl and colleagues' akinetopsia patient shows no deficit to color or object perception (although deriving depth and structure from motion is problematic, see above) and object agnostics do not have damaged motion or color perception, making the three disorders triply dissociable. Taken together this evidence suggests that even though distinct properties may employ the same early visual areas they are functionally independent. Furthermore, that the intensity of subjective perceptual experience (e.g. color) correlates with activity in these specific areas (e.g. V4), the recent evidence that synaesthetes show V4 activation during the perceptual experience of color, as well as the fact that damage to these areas results in concomitant behavioral deficits (the processing may be occurring but perceivers do not have access to the information) are all evidence for visual modularity.

== See also ==
- Heautoscopy
- Modularity
- Society of Mind which proposes the mind is made up of agents
- Two streams hypothesis
