= Disc shedding =

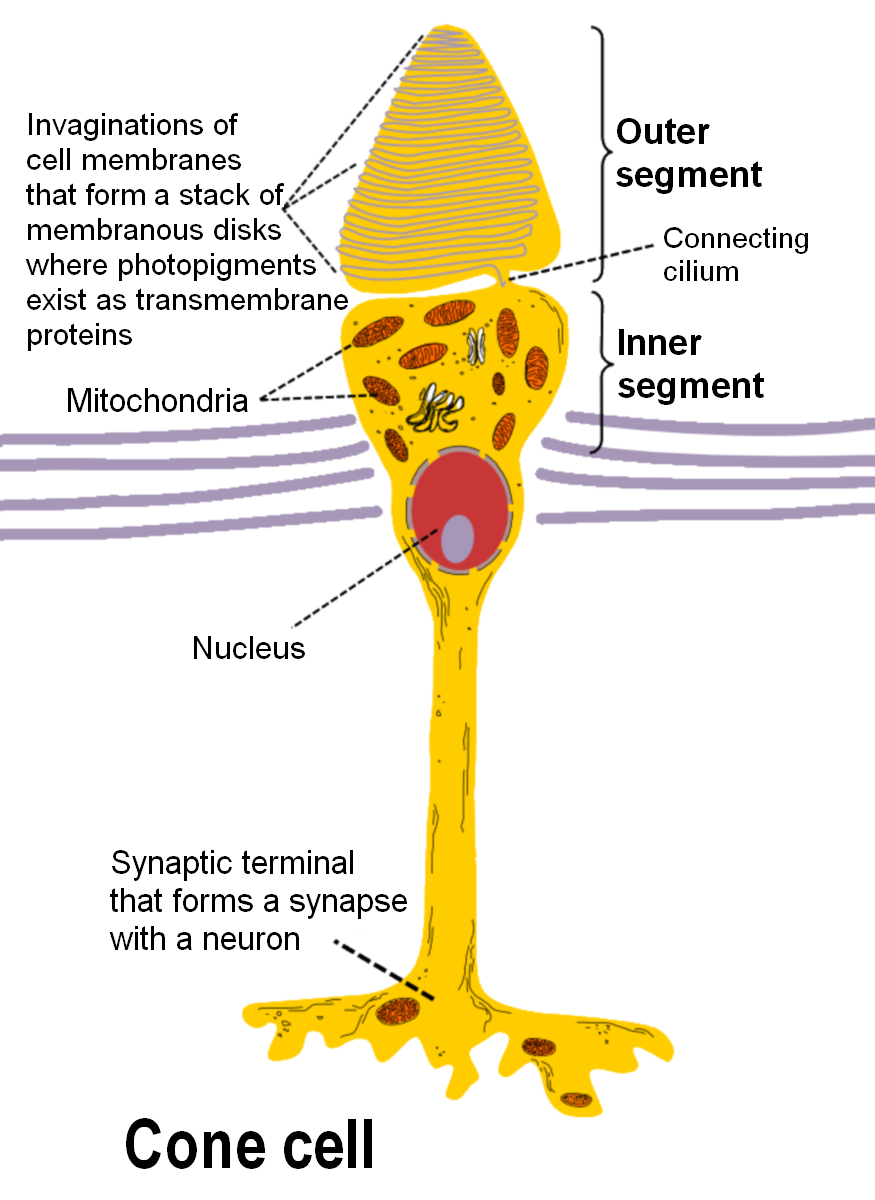
drawing of a cone cell showing the invaginations of the outer segment that form the 'discs'

Disc shedding is the process by which photoreceptor cells in the retina are renewed. The disc formations in the outer segment of photoreceptors, which contain the photosensitive opsins, are completely renewed every ten days.

== Photoreceptors ==
The retina contains two types of photoreceptor – rod cells and cone cells. There are about 6-7 million cones that mediate photopic vision, and they are concentrated in the macula at the center of the retina. There are about 120 million rods that are more sensitive than the cones and therefore mediate scotopic vision.

A vertebrate's photoreceptors are divided into three parts:

- an outer segment that contains the photosensitive opsins
- an inner segment that contains the cell's metabolic machinery (endoplasmic reticulum, Golgi complex, ribosomes, mitochondria)
- a synaptic terminal at which contacts with second-order neurons of the retina are made

== Discs ==
The photosensitive outer segment consists of a series of discrete membranous discs .

While in the rod, these discs lack any direct connection to the surface membrane (with the exception of a few recently formed basal discs that remain in continuity with the surface), the cone's photosensitive membrane is continuous with the surface membrane. The outer segment (OS) discs are densely packed with rhodopsin for high-sensitivity light detection. These discs are completely replaced once every ten days and this continuous renewal continues throughout the lifetime of the sighted animal.

After the opsins are synthesized, they fuse to the plasma membrane, which then invaginates with discs budding off internally, forming the tightly packed stacks of outer segment discs. From translation of opsin to formation of the discs takes just a couple of hours.

== Shedding ==
Disc shedding was first described by RW Young in 1967. Discs mature along with their distal migration; aged discs shed at the distal tip and are engulfed by the neighboring retinal pigment epithelial (RPE) cells for degradation.

One early study showed that cones may not experience the cone shedding as rods do and may renew by replacing molecular constituents individually. However, other studies do show that at least some mammalian cones do shed their discs as a normal ongoing process.

Each day about one tenth of the length of the outer segment is lost, so that after ten days the entire outer segment has been replaced. Regulating factors are involved at each step. While disc assembly is mostly genetically controlled, disc shedding and the subsequent RPE phagocytosis appear to be regulated by environmental factors like light and temperature.

The timing of shedding follows a circadian rhythm according to neuromodulators, namely dopamine and melatonin. Melatonin is synthesized by the photoreceptors at night, and is inhibited by light and dopamine, so triggers cone disc shedding. Dopamine production is stimulated by light and inhibited by dark and melatonin, so triggers cone disc shedding. Importantly, rod discs are shed during the day and cone discs are shed during the night.

== Mechanism ==
=== Traditional theories ===
One grey area in the entire mechanism of outer segment disc shedding is in what exactly triggers the detachment of the discs and how they are transported out of the OS and phagocytosed by the RPE cells.

Some studies suggest that disc detachment precedes engulfment by the RPE cells, and that an active process in the rod outer segment severs the disc. However, other studies observed RPE cell processes intruding into the OS during disc detachment. These processes are structurally similar to processes formed by macrophages during phagocytosis and were accordingly referred to as pseudopodia. The study suggested that these pseudopodia were the organelles of phagocytosis and that they may play a direct role in disc detachment.

=== Recent research ===
A 2007 paper offers a third theory that builds on recent evidence that suggests that rhodopsin-deficient mice fail to develop OSS. Researchers at Cornell hypothesized that rhodopsin itself has a role in OS biogenesis, in addition to its role as a phototransduction receptor. While the molecular basis underlying rhodopsin's participation in OS development is unknown, emerging evidence suggests that rhodopsin's cytoplasmic C-terminal tail bears an “address signal” for its transport from its site of synthesis in the rod cell body to the OS.
