= Heliophobia (disambiguation) =

Heliophobia refers to light sensitivity:

- In psychology, heliophobia is the morbid fear of sunlight
- In medicine it can refer to:
  - Hemeralopia, day blindness, inability to see clearly in bright light
  - Photophobia, an excessive sensitivity of the eyes to sunlight. Notable causes include:
    - Keratoconus, results in extreme optic sensitivity to sunlight and bright lights
- In biology, heliophobic plants or animals have an aversion to sunlight. Heliophobous plants are commonly known as "shade-tolerant".

== See also ==
- Helium, a chemical element; other elements can be heliophilic, attracted to helium, or heliophobic, repelled by helium
- Phototropism, growth towards or away from light, particularly in plants and fungi
- Phytophotodermatitis, a potentially serious skin inflammation resulting from contact with a plant-based photosensitizing substance followed by exposure to ultraviolet light
- Porphyria cutanea tarda, a disease that causes the skin to be overly sensitive to sunlight to the point of causing blisters
