= Achromatopsia =

- Other names: Rod Monochromacy
- Specialty: Ophthalmology
- Symptoms: Monochromacy, Day blindness, Photophobia
- Causes: Congenital malfunction of the Visual phototransduction pathway
- Diagnostic method: Electroretinography
- Frequency: 1/30,000 × 100% = 0.0033%

Achromatopsia, also known as rod monochromacy, is a medical syndrome that exhibits symptoms relating to five conditions, most notably monochromacy. Historically, the name referred to monochromacy in general, but now typically refers only to an autosomal recessive congenital color vision condition. The term is also used to describe cerebral achromatopsia, though monochromacy is usually the only common symptom. The conditions include: monochromatic color blindness, poor visual acuity, and day-blindness. The syndrome is also present in an incomplete form that exhibits milder symptoms, including residual color vision. Achromatopsia is estimated to affect 1 in 30,000 live births worldwide.

== Signs and symptoms ==
The five symptoms associated with achromatopsia are:

1. Color blindness – usually monochromacy
2. Reduced visual acuity – uncorrectable with lenses
3. Hemeralopia – with the subject exhibiting photophobia
4. Nystagmus

The syndrome is typically first noticed in children around six months of age due to their photophobia or their nystagmus. The nystagmus becomes less noticeable with age but the other symptoms of the syndrome become more relevant as school age approaches. Visual acuity is usually stable over time and is 20/200 or less in complete achromatopsia, while nystagmus and sensitivity to bright light may improve slightly.

If the light level during testing is optimized, achromats may achieve corrected visual acuity of 20/100 to 20/150 at lower light levels, regardless of the absence of color. The fundus of the eye is usually normal, but subtle macular changes or narrowing of the retinal vessels may be present.

Achromatopsia can be classified as complete or incomplete. In general, symptoms of incomplete achromatopsia are attenuated versions of those of complete achromatopsia. Individuals with incomplete achromatopsia have reduced visual acuity with or without nystagmus or photophobia. In incomplete achromatopsia, one or more cone types may be partially functioning, and visual acuity may be as high as 20/80.

== Cause ==
Achromatopsia is sometimes called rod monochromacy (as opposed to blue cone monochromacy), as achromats exhibit a complete absence of cone cell activity via electroretinography in photopic lighting. There are multiple genetic causes of achromatopsia, including mutations in:

- the cone cell cyclic nucleotide-gated ion channel proteins CNGA3 (ACHM2) and CNGB3 (ACHM3)
- the cone photoreceptor transducin (GNAT2, ACHM4),
- subunits of cone phosphodiesterase PDE6C (ACHM5) and PDEH (ACHM6, OMIM 610024), and
- ATF6 (ACHM7).

== Pathophysiology ==
The hemeralopic aspect of achromatopsia can be diagnosed non-invasively using electroretinography. The response at low (scotopic) and median (mesopic) light levels will be normal but the response under high light level (photopic) conditions will be absent. The mesopic level is approximately a hundred times lower than the clinical level used for the typical high level electroretinogram. When as described; the condition is due to a saturation in the neural portion of the retina and not due to the absence of the photoreceptors per se.

In general, the molecular pathomechanism of achromatopsia is either the inability to properly control or respond to altered levels of cGMP; particularly important in visual perception as its level controls the opening of cyclic nucleotide-gated ion channels (CNGs). Decreasing the concentration of cGMP results in closure of CNGs and resulting hyperpolarization and cessation of glutamate release. Native retinal CNGs are composed of 2 α- and 2 β-subunits, which are CNGA3 and CNGB3, respectively, in cone cells. When expressed alone, CNGB3 cannot produce functional channels, whereas this is not the case for CNGA3. Coassembly of CNGA3 and CNGB3 produces channels with altered membrane expression, ion permeability (Na^{+} vs. K^{+} and Ca^{2+}), relative efficacy of cAMP/cGMP activation, decreased outward rectification, current flickering, and sensitivity to block by L-cis-diltiazem.

Mutations tend to result in the loss of CNGB3 function or gain of function—often increased affinity for cGMP—of CNGA3. cGMP levels are controlled by the activity of the cone cell transducin, GNAT2. Mutations in GNAT2 tend to result in a truncated and, presumably, non-functional protein, thereby preventing alteration of cGMP levels by photons. There is a positive correlation between the severity of mutations in these proteins and the completeness of the achromatopsia phenotype.

Molecular diagnosis can be established by identification of biallelic variants in the causative genes. Molecular genetic testing approaches used in achromatopsia can include targeted analysis for the common CNGB3 variant c.1148delC (p.Thr383IlefsTer13), use of a multigenerational panel, or comprehensive genomic testing.

=== ACHM2 ===
While some mutations in CNGA3 result in truncated and, presumably, non-functional channels this is largely not the case. While few mutations have received in-depth study, at least one mutation does result in functional channels. Curiously, this mutation, T369S, produces profound alterations when expressed without CNGB3. One such alteration is decreased affinity for cyclic guanosine monophosphate. Others include the introduction of a sub-conductance, altered single-channel gating kinetics, and increased calcium permeability.

When mutant T369S channels coassemble with CNGB3, however, the only remaining aberration is increased calcium permeability. While it is not immediately clear how this increase in Ca^{2+} leads to achromatopsia, one hypothesis is that this increased current decreases the signal-to-noise ratio. Other characterized mutations, such as Y181C and the other S1 region mutations, result in decreased current density due to an inability of the channel to traffic to the surface. Such loss of function will undoubtedly negate the cone cell's ability to respond to visual input and produce achromatopsia. At least one other missense mutation outside of the S1 region, T224R, also leads to loss of function.

=== ACHM3 ===
While very few mutations in CNGB3 have been characterized, the vast majority of them result in truncated channels that are presumably non-functional. This will largely result in haploinsufficiency, though in some cases the truncated proteins may be able to coassemble with wild-type channels in a dominant negative fashion. The most prevalent ACHM3 mutation, T383IfsX12, results in a non-functional truncated protein that does not properly traffic to the cell membrane.

The three missense mutations that have received further study show a number of aberrant properties, with one underlying theme. The R403Q mutation, which lies in the pore region of the channel, results in an increase in outward current rectification, versus the largely linear current-voltage relationship of wild-type channels, concomitant with an increase in cGMP affinity. The other mutations show either increased (S435F) or decreased (F525N) surface expression but also with increased affinity for cAMP and cGMP. It is the increased affinity for cGMP and cAMP in these mutants that is likely the disorder-causing change. Such increased affinity will result in channels that are insensitive to the slight concentration changes of cGMP due to light input into the retina.

=== ACHM4 ===
Upon activation by light, cone opsin causes the exchange of GDP for GTP in the guanine nucleotide binding protein (G-protein) α-transducing activity polypeptide 2 (GNAT2). This causes the release of the activated α-subunit from the inhibitory β/γ-subunits. This α-subunit then activates a phosphodiesterase that catalyzes the conversion of cGMP to GMP, thereby reducing current through CNG3 channels. As this process is absolutely vital for proper color processing it is not surprising that mutations in GNAT2 lead to achromatopsia. The known mutations in this gene, all result in truncated proteins. Presumably, then, these proteins are non-functional and, consequently, cone opsin that has been activated by light does not lead to altered cGMP levels or photoreceptor membrane hyperpolarization.

== Management ==
=== Gene therapy ===
As achromatopsia is linked to only a few single-gene mutations, it is a good candidate for gene therapy. Gene therapy is a technique for injecting functional genes into the cells that need them, replacing or overruling the original alleles linked to achromatopsia, thereby curing it – at least in part. Achromatopsia has been a focus of gene therapy since 2010, when achromatopsia in dogs was partially cured. Several clinical trials on humans are ongoing with mixed results. In July 2023, a study found positive but limited improvements on congenital CNGA3 achromatopsia.

=== Eyeborg ===
Since 2003, a cybernetic device called the eyeborg has allowed people to perceive color through sound waves. This form of sensory substitution maps the hue perceived by a camera worn on the head to a pitch experienced through bone conduction according to a sonochromatic scale. This allows achromats (or even the totally blind) to perceive – or estimate – the color of an object. Achromat and artist Neil Harbisson was the first to use the eyeborg in early 2004, which allowed him to start painting in color. He has since acted as a spokesperson for the technology, namely in a 2012 TED Talk. A 2015 study suggests that achromats who use the Eyeborg for several years exhibit neural plasticity, which indicates the sensory substitution has become intuitive for them.

=== Other accommodations ===
While gene therapy and the Eyeborg may currently have low uptake with achromats, there are several more practical ways for achromats to manage their condition:

- Some colors can be estimated through the use of colored filters. By comparing the luminosity of a color with and without a filter (or between two different filters), the color can be estimated. This is the premise of monocular lenses and the SeeKey. In some US states, achromats can use a red filter while driving to determine the color of a traffic light.
- To alleviate photophobia stemming from hemeralopia, dark red or plum colored filters as either sunglasses or tinted contacts are very helpful at decreasing light sensitivity.
- To manage the low visual acuity that is typical of achromatopsia, achromats may use telescopic systems, specifically when driving, to increase the resolution of an object of interest.

== Epidemiology ==
Achromatopsia is a relatively uncommon disorder, with a prevalence of 1 in 30,000 people.

However, on the small Micronesian atoll of Pingelap, approximately five percent of the atoll's 3,000 inhabitants are affected. This is the result of a population bottleneck caused by a typhoon and ensuing famine in the 1770s, which killed all but about twenty islanders, including one who was heterozygous for achromatopsia.

The people of this region have termed achromatopsia "maskun", which literally means "not see" in Pingelapese. This unusual population drew neurologist Oliver Sacks to the island for which he wrote his 1997 book, The Island of the Colorblind.

== Blue cone monochromacy ==
Blue cone monochromacy (BCM) is another genetic condition causing monochromacy. It mimics many of the symptoms of incomplete achromatopsia and before the discovery of its molecular biological basis was commonly referred to as x-linked achromatopsia, sex-linked achromatopsia or atypical achromatopsia. BCM stems from mutations or deletions of the OPN1LW and OPN1MW genes, both on the X chromosome. As a recessive x-linked condition, BCM disproportionately affects males, unlike typical achromatopsia.

== Cerebral achromatopsia ==
Cerebral achromatopsia is a form of acquired color blindness that is caused by damage to the cerebral cortex. Damage is most commonly localized to visual area V4 of the visual cortex (the major part of the colour center), which receives information from the parvocellular pathway involved in color processing. It is most frequently caused by physical trauma, hemorrhage or tumor tissue growth. If there is unilateral damage, a loss of color perception in only half of the visual field may result; this is known as hemiachromatopsia. Cerebral achromats usually do not experience the other major symptoms of congenital achromatopsia, since photopic vision still functions.

Color agnosia involves having difficulty recognizing colors, while still being able to perceive them as measured by a color matching or categorizing task.

== Terminology ==
Monochromacy
Complete lack of the perception of color in a subject, seeing only in black, white, and shades of grey.
Hemeralopia
Reduced visual capacity in bright light, i.e. day-blindness.
Nystagmus
Term to describe both normal and pathological conditions related to the oculomotor system. In the current context, it is a pathological condition involving an uncontrolled oscillatory movement of the eyes during which the amplitude of oscillation is quite noticeable and the frequency of the oscillation tends to be quite low.
Photophobia
Avoidance of bright light by those who have hemeralopia.

== See also ==
- Elham Mahamid Ruzin (born 1990), Israeli Paralympic goalball player
- The Island of the Colorblind, a book describing prevalent achromatopsia due to the founder effect.
