= Köllner's rule =

Progressive color vision loss

Köllner's Rule is a term used in ophthalmology and optometry that pertains to the progressive nature of color vision loss that is secondary to eye disease. This rule states that outer retinal diseases and media changes result in blue-yellow color defects, while diseases of the inner retina, optic nerve, visual pathway, and visual cortex will result in red-green defects. This is possibly related to the increased susceptibility of S-cones and rods to ischaemia and oxidative damage, although S-cone loss is more noticeable due to their lower density and their higher metabolic rate.

There are exceptions to Köllner's rule, notably glaucoma, which is an optic nerve disorder, and is usually associated with blue-yellow defects in the initial phase, following which red-green defects later develop. This is hypothesised to be due to receptor-mediated excitotoxicity of ganglial cells, and that parvocellular retinal ganglial cells mediating red-green opponency are predominantly affected because they are more common.

== Sources ==
- Köllner H. Die Störungen des Farbensinners. ihre klinische Bedeutung und ihre Diagnose. Berlin: Karger; 1912. Schwartz S. Visual Perception: A Clinical Orientation. New York, New York; 2004.
- Acquired colour vision defects in glaucoma
