= Perceptual asynchrony =

Perceptual asynchrony refers to the phenomenon of two simultaneously presented attributes of the visual world being perceived by humans asynchronously instead of simultaneously.

Perceptual asynchrony was first demonstrated in 1997 by Konstantinos Moutoussis and Semir Zeki. Moutoussis and Zeki provided evidence that people perceive the color and direction of motion of a visual stimulus with a time lag - they may perceive the color before the direction of motion. They quantified this time gap to be between 70–80 milliseconds.

== Description ==
The experiments through which perceptual asynchrony was derived were pairing experiments in which subjects are asked to determine the color and direction of a single stimulus that is moving up and down (or right and left) and changing its color from, say red to green, while doing so – the change in the color and direction of motion being in and out of phase with respect to each other.

Minor variations of the 1997 experiment have yielded similar results. An apparent asynchrony has also been documented for other visual features. For example, one study found evidence suggesting that the color of lines is perceived about 40 milliseconds before their orientation. The degree of perceptual asynchrony can be considerably reduced by manipulating the stimuli in a variety of ways, which complicates its attribution to a simple difference in processing times for color and motion.

== Interpretation ==
According to Moutoussis and Zeki, the phenomenon shows:

- that two attributes, presented simultaneously in terms of physical reality, are not perceived simultaneously but asynchronously;
- that, as a result, the brain incorrectly binds the two presented attributes, in other words that it binds an attribute perceived at one moment with the other attribute that had been perceived some 40 to 80 ms earlier;
- that, consequently, there is no brain system or area that “waits” for all visual attributes to be brought up to a perceptual level before binding them together to give a percept in which the two attributes are seen in perfect registration.

Zeki went on to propose that color, motion, and shape are experienced via separate "micro-consciousnesses" evoked by distinct brain areas.

The theory that the phenomenon is caused by difference in color and motion processing time has been challenged by multiple lines of evidence. For example, the evidence for an asynchrony is much smaller or absent when people are asked to judge the relative timing of color and motion changes rather than their pairing. Perceiving changes in a feature seems to require less feature processing and yields higher temporal precision than the conventional feature pairing judgment. This suggests a complex picture of how the timing of events is represented rather than a simple processing latency that applies to all aspects or uses of an event.

Dr.Shinya Nishida & Dr.Alan Johnston, notable cognitive neuroscientists proposed that the brain ordinarily relies on the neural responses evoked by the onset of a feature to estimate its relative timing and thereby compensate for the variation in processing times for different features. Nishida & Johnston suggested that these onset responses or "transients" are disrupted by dynamic displays such as that of Moutoussis & Zeki, because the constant motion means that transient responses occur continuously, preventing them from signaling the specific onset time of the motion. Nishida & Johnston created displays in which the color onset also was not signalled by a unique feature and found that greatly reduced the asynchrony.

To further investigate what aspects of the intervals of color and motion determine the perceptual pairing, one study had participants judge the predominant pairing of color and motion when the alternating color and motion are of different durations. Changing the duration of the color, but not of the motion, shifted the timing required to maximize the consistency of pairing judgments. This suggested that the timing of the color onset was particularly important, as one would predict from the Nishida & Johnston timer-marker theory. It was further found that the asynchrony could be eliminated by cuing with transients the time of the color and motion changes.
