= Hemeralopia =

- Specialty: Ophthalmology

Hemeralopia or day blindness is the inability to see clearly in bright light and is the exact opposite of nyctalopia (night blindness), the inability to see clearly in low light. It is also called heliophobia. It can be described as insufficient adaptation to bright light.

In hemeralopia, daytime vision gets worse, characterised by photoaversion (dislike/avoidance of light) rather than photophobia (eye discomfort/pain in light), which is typical of inflammations of the eye. Nighttime vision largely remains unchanged due to the use of rods as opposed to cones (during the day), which are affected by hemeralopia and in turn degrade the daytime optical response. Hence, many patients feel they see better at dusk than in daytime.

The word hemeralopia comes from the Greek ημέρα hemera, "day", and αλαός alaos, "blindness". Hemera was the Greek goddess of day, and Nyx was the goddess of night. Hemeralopia has been used to describe night blindness rather than day blindness by many non-English-speaking doctors, causing confusion.

== Causes ==
Hemeralopia is known to occur in several ocular conditions. Cone dystrophy and achromatopsia, affecting the cones in the retina, and the anti-epileptic drug trimethadione are typical causes. Adie's pupil, which fails to constrict in response to light; aniridia, which is absence of the iris; and albinism, where the iris is defectively pigmented, may also cause this. Central cataracts, due to the lens clouding, disperses the light before it can reach the retina and is a common cause of hemeralopia and photoaversion in the elderly. Cancer-associated retinopathy (CAR), seen when certain cancers incite the production of deleterious antibodies against retinal components, may cause hemeralopia.

Another known cause is a rare genetic condition called Cohen syndrome (aka Pepper syndrome). Cohen syndrome is mostly characterized by obesity, intellectual disability and craniofacial dysmorphism due to genetic mutation at locus 8q22–23. Rarely, it may have ocular complications such as hemeralopia, pigmentary chorioretinitis, optic atrophy or retinal/iris coloboma, having a serious effect on the person's vision.

Yet another cause of hemeralopia is uni- or bilateral postchiasmatic brain injury. This may also cause concomitant nyctalopia.

== Management ==
People with hemeralopia may benefit from sunglasses. Wherever possible, environmental illumination should be adjusted to comfortable level. Light-filtering lenses appear to help in people reporting photophobia.

Otherwise, treatment relies on identifying and treating any underlying disorder.

== In popular culture ==
The protagonist of the Bollywood movie Aankh Micholi has this condition, which results in comedic incidents within the film.

== See also ==
- Adaptation (eye)
