= Color vision =

Ability to perceive differences in light frequency

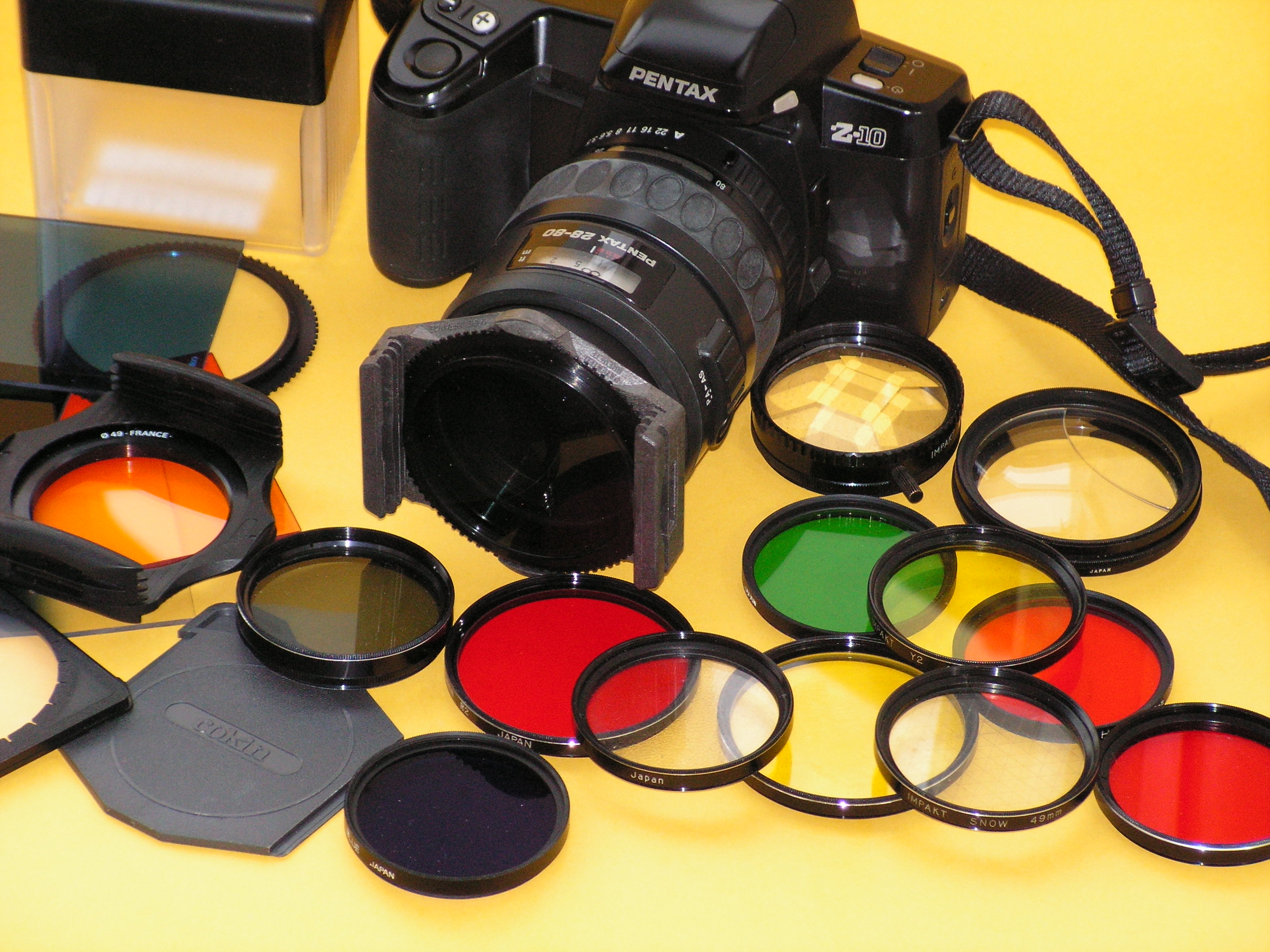
Colorless, green, and red photographic filters as imaged by camera

Color vision (CV), a feature of visual perception. It is the ability to perceive differences between light composed of different frequencies independently of light intensity.

Color perception is a part of the larger visual system and is mediated by a complex process between neurons that begins with differential stimulation of different types of photoreceptors by light entering the eye. Those photoreceptors then emit outputs that are propagated through many layers of neurons ultimately leading to higher cognitive functions in the brain. Color vision is found in many animals and is mediated by similar underlying mechanisms with common types of biological molecules and a complex history of the evolution of color vision within different animal taxa. In primates, color vision may have evolved under selective pressure for a variety of visual tasks including the foraging for nutritious young leaves, ripe fruit, and flowers, as well as detecting predator camouflage and emotional states in other primates.

== Wavelength ==
sRGB rendering of the spectrum of visible light
Color	Wavelength (nm)	Frequency (THz)	Photon energy (eV)
violet	380–450	670–790	2.75–3.26
blue	450–485	620–670	2.56–2.75
cyan	485–500	600–620	2.48–2.56
green	500–565	530–600	2.19–2.48
yellow	565–590	510–530	2.10–2.19
orange	590–625	480–510	1.98–2.10
red	625–750	400–480	1.65–1.98

Isaac Newton discovered that white light after being split into its component colors when passed through a dispersive prism could be recombined to make white light by passing them through a different prism.

Photopic relative brightness sensitivity of the human visual system as a function of wavelength (luminosity function)

The visible light spectrum ranges from about 380 to 740 nanometers. Spectral colors (colors that are produced by a narrow band of wavelengths) such as red, orange, yellow, green, cyan, blue, and violet can be found in this range. These spectral colors do not refer to a single wavelength, but rather to a set of wavelengths: red, 625–740 nm; orange, 590–625 nm; yellow, 565–590 nm; green, 500–565 nm; cyan, 485–500 nm; blue, 450–485 nm; violet, 380–450 nm.

Wavelengths longer or shorter than this range are called infrared or ultraviolet, respectively. Humans cannot generally see these wavelengths, but other animals may.

=== Hue detection ===
Sufficient differences in wavelength cause a difference in the perceived hue; the just-noticeable difference in wavelength varies from about 1 nm near cyan (blue-green) and yellow wavelengths, about 3-4 nm for green wavelengths, and up to 10 nm and more in the longer red and shorter blue wavelengths. Although the human eye can distinguish up to a few hundred hues, when those pure spectral colors are mixed together or diluted with white light, the number of distinguishable chromaticities can be much higher.

In very low light levels, vision is scotopic: light is detected by rod cells of the retina. Rods are maximally sensitive to wavelengths near 500 nm and play little, if any, role in color vision. In brighter light, such as daylight, vision is photopic: light is detected by cone cells which are responsible for color vision. Cones are sensitive to a range of wavelengths, but are most sensitive to wavelengths near 555 nm. Between these regions, mesopic vision comes into play and both rods and cones provide signals to the retinal ganglion cells. The shift in color perception from dim light to daylight gives rise to differences known as the Purkinje effect.

The perception of "white" is formed by the entire spectrum of visible light, or by mixing colors of just a few wavelengths in animals with few types of color receptors. In humans, white light can be perceived by combining wavelengths such as red, green, and blue, or just a pair of complementary colors such as blue and yellow.

=== Non-spectral colors ===
There are a variety of colors in addition to spectral colors and their hues. These include grayscale colors, shades of colors obtained by mixing grayscale colors with spectral colors, violet-red colors, impossible colors, and metallic colors.

Grayscale colors include white, gray, and black. Rods contain rhodopsin, which reacts to light intensity, providing grayscale coloring.

Shades include colors such as pink or brown. Pink is obtained from mixing red and white. Brown may be obtained from mixing orange with gray or black. Navy is obtained from mixing blue and black.

Violet-red colors include hues and shades of magenta. The light spectrum is a line on which violet is one end and the other is red, and yet we see hues of purple that connect those two colors.

Impossible colors are a combination of cone responses that cannot be naturally produced. For example, medium cones cannot be activated completely on their own; if they were, we would see a 'hyper-green' color.

== Dimensionality ==
Color vision is categorized foremost according to the dimensionality of the color gamut, which is defined by the number of primaries required to represent the color vision. This is generally equal to the number of photopsins expressed: a correlation that holds for vertebrates but not invertebrates. The common vertebrate ancestor possessed four photopsins (expressed in cones) plus rhodopsin (expressed in rods), so was tetrachromatic. However, many vertebrate lineages have lost one or many photopsin genes, leading to lower-dimension color vision. The dimensions of color vision range from 1-dimensional and up:

Dimension	Characteristic	Occurrence
Monochromacy	1D color vision lack of any color perception	Most skates and some mammals, including Pinnipeds, Cetaceans and Xenarthra
Dichromacy	2D color vision	Most mammals and a quarter of color blind humans
Trichromacy	3D color vision	Most Old World monkeys and apes, including most humans; possibly monotremes and some marsupials
Tetrachromacy	4D color vision	Most birds, reptiles and fish, and rarely in humans
Pentachromacy and higher	5D+ color vision	Rare in vertebrates

== Physiology of color perception ==
Normalized response spectra of human cones to monochromatic spectral stimuli, with wavelength given in nanometers

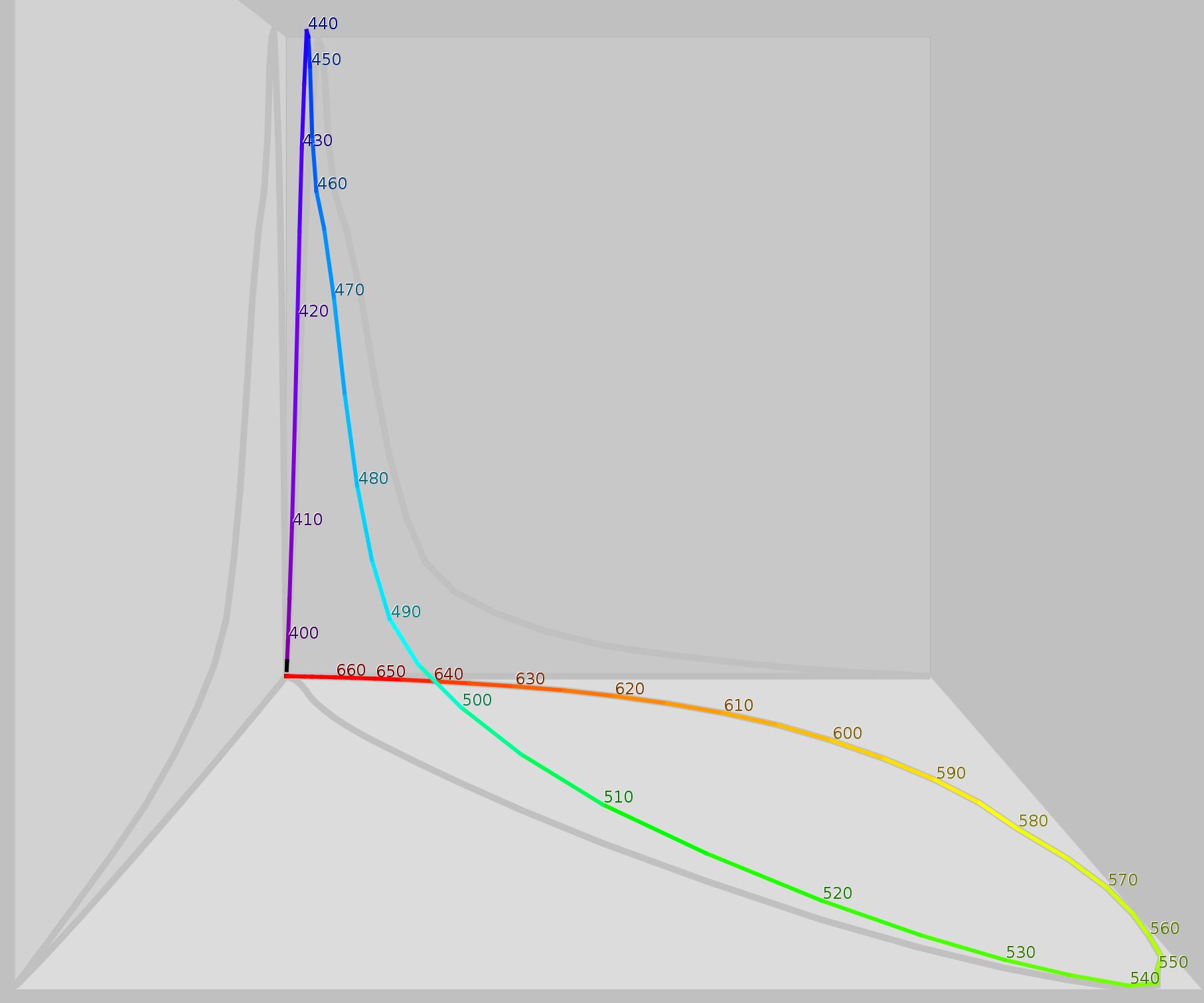
The same figures as above represented here as a single curve in three (normalized cone response) dimensions

Perception of color begins with specialized retinal cells known as cone cells. Cone cells contain different forms of opsin – a pigment protein – that have different spectral sensitivities. Humans contain three types, resulting in trichromatic color vision.

Each individual cone contains pigments composed of opsin apoprotein covalently linked to a light-absorbing prosthetic group: either 11-cis-hydroretinal or, more rarely, 11-cis-dehydroretinal.

The cones are conventionally labeled according to the ordering of the wavelengths of the peaks of their spectral sensitivities: short (S), medium (M), and long (L) cone types. These three types do not correspond well to particular colors as we know them. Rather, the perception of color is achieved by a complex process that starts with the differential output of these cells in the retina and which is finalized in the visual cortex and associative areas of the brain.

For example, while the L cones have been referred to simply as red receptors, microspectrophotometry has shown that their peak sensitivity is in the greenish-yellow region of the spectrum. Similarly, the S cones and M cones do not directly correspond to blue and green, although they are often described as such. The RGB color model, therefore, is a convenient means for representing color but is not directly based on the types of cones in the human eye.

The peak response of human cone cells varies, even among individuals with typical color vision; in some non-human species this polymorphic variation is even greater, and it may well be adaptive.

=== Theories ===
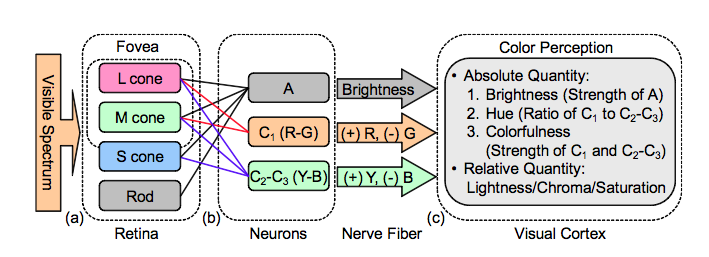
Opponent process theory

Two complementary theories of color vision are the trichromatic theory and the opponent process theory. The trichromatic theory, or Young–Helmholtz theory, proposed in the 19th century by Thomas Young and Hermann von Helmholtz, posits three types of cones preferentially sensitive to blue, green, and red, respectively. Others have suggested that the trichromatic theory is not specifically a theory of color vision but a theory of receptors for all vision, including color but not specific or limited to it. Equally, it has been suggested that the relationship between the phenomenal opponency described by Ewald Hering and the physiological opponent processes are not straightforward (see below), making of physiological opponency a mechanism that is relevant to the whole of vision, and not just to color vision alone. Hering proposed the opponent process theory in 1872. It states that the visual system interprets color in an antagonistic way: red vs. green, blue vs. yellow, black vs. white. Both theories are generally accepted as valid, describing different stages in visual physiology, visualized in the adjacent diagram.

Green–magenta and blue–yellow are scales with mutually exclusive boundaries. In the same way that there cannot exist a "slightly negative" positive number, a single eye cannot perceive a bluish-yellow or a reddish-green. Although these two theories are both currently widely accepted theories, past and more recent work has led to criticism of the opponent process theory, stemming from a number of what are presented as discrepancies in the standard opponent process theory. For example, the phenomenon of an after-image of complementary color can be induced by fatiguing the cells responsible for color perception, by staring at a vibrant color for a length of time, and then looking at a white surface. This phenomenon of complementary colors shows that cyan, rather than green, is the complement of red, and that magenta, rather than red, is the complement of green. It therefore also shows that the reddish-green color supposed to be impossible by opponent process theory is actually the color yellow. Although this phenomenon is more readily explained by the trichromatic theory, explanations for the discrepancy may include alterations to the opponent process theory, such as redefining the opponent colors as red vs. cyan, to reflect this effect. Despite such criticisms, both theories remain in use.

A newer theory proposed by Edwin H. Land, the Retinex Theory, is based on a demonstration of color constancy, which shows that the color of any surface that is part of a complex natural scene is to a large degree independent of the wavelength composition of the light reflected from it. Also the after-image produced by looking at a given part of a complex scene is also independent of the wavelength composition of the light reflected from it alone. Thus, while the color of the after-image produced by looking at a green surface that is reflecting more "green" (middle-wave) than "red" (long-wave) light is magenta, so is the after–image of the same surface when it reflects more "red" than "green" light (when it is still perceived as green). This would seem to rule out an explanation of color opponency based on retinal cone adaptation.

According to Land's Retinex theory, color in a natural scene depends upon the three sets of cone cells ("red," "green," and "blue") separately perceiving each surface's relative lightness in the scene and, together with the visual cortex, assigning color based on comparing the lightness values perceived by each set of cone cells.

=== Cone cells in the human eye ===
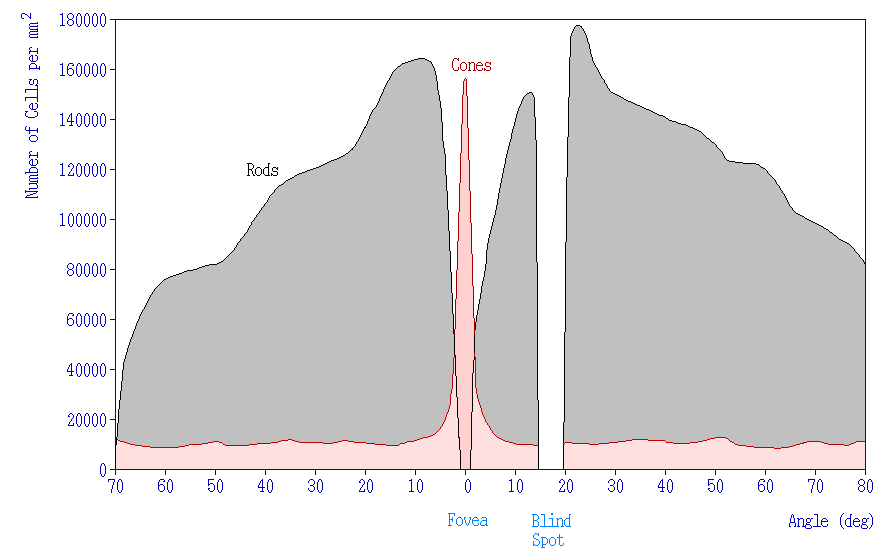
Cones are present at a low density throughout most of the retina, with a sharp peak in the center of the fovea. Conversely, rods are present at high density throughout most of the retina, with a sharp decline in the fovea.

A range of wavelengths of light stimulates each of these receptor types to varying degrees. The brain combines the information from each type of receptor to give rise to different perceptions of different wavelengths of light.

Cone type	Name	Range	Peak wavelength
S	β	400–500 nm	420–440 nm
M	γ	450–630 nm	534–555 nm
L	ρ	500–700 nm	564–580 nm

Cones and rods are not evenly distributed in the human eye. Cones have a high density at the fovea and a low density in the rest of the retina. Thus color information is mostly taken in at the fovea. Humans have poor color perception in their peripheral vision, and much of the color we see in our periphery may be filled in by what our brains expect to be there on the basis of context and memories. However, our accuracy of color perception in the periphery increases with the size of stimulus.

The opsins (photopigments) present in the L and M cones are encoded on the X chromosome; defective encoding of these leads to the two most common forms of color blindness. The OPN1LW gene, which encodes the opsin present in the L cones, is highly polymorphic; one study found 85 variants in a sample of 236 men. A small percentage of women may have an extra type of color receptor because they have different alleles for the gene for the L opsin on each X chromosome. X chromosome inactivation means that while only one opsin is expressed in each cone cell, both types may occur overall, and some women may therefore show a degree of tetrachromatic color vision. Variations in OPN1MW, which encodes the opsin expressed in M cones, appear to be rare, and the observed variants have no effect on spectral sensitivity.

=== Color in the primate brain ===
Visual pathways in the human brain. The ventral stream (purple) is important in color recognition. The dorsal stream (green) is also shown. They originate from a common source in the visual cortex.

Color processing begins at a very early level in the visual system (even within the retina) through initial color opponent mechanisms. Both Helmholtz's trichromatic theory and Hering's opponent-process theory are therefore correct, but trichromacy arises at the level of the receptors, and opponent processes arise at the level of retinal ganglion cells and beyond. In Hering's theory, opponent mechanisms refer to the opposing color effect of red–green, blue–yellow, and light-dark. However, in the visual system, it is the activity of the different receptor types that are opposed. Some midget retinal ganglion cells oppose L and M cone activity, which corresponds loosely to red–green opponency, but actually runs along an axis from blue-green to magenta. Small bistratified retinal ganglion cells oppose input from the S cones to input from the L and M cones. This is often thought to correspond to blue–yellow opponency but actually runs along a color axis from yellow-green to violet.

Visual information is then sent to the brain from retinal ganglion cells via the optic nerve to the optic chiasma: a point where the two optic nerves meet and information from the temporal (contralateral) visual field crosses to the other side of the brain. After the optic chiasma, the visual tracts are referred to as the optic tracts, which enter the thalamus to synapse at the lateral geniculate nucleus (LGN).

The lateral geniculate nucleus is divided into laminae (zones), of which there are three types: the M-laminae, consisting primarily of M-cells, the P-laminae, consisting primarily of P-cells, and the koniocellular laminae. M- and P-cells receive relatively balanced input from both L- and M-cones throughout most of the retina, although this seems to not be the case at the fovea, with midget cells synapsing in the P-laminae. The koniocellular laminae receives axons from the small bistratified ganglion cells.

After synapsing at the LGN, the visual tract continues on back to the primary visual cortex (V1) located at the back of the brain within the occipital lobe. Within V1 there is a distinct band (striation). This is also referred to as "striate cortex", with other cortical visual regions referred to collectively as "extrastriate cortex". It is at this stage that color processing becomes much more complicated.

In V1 the simple three-color segregation begins to break down. Many cells in V1 respond to some parts of the spectrum better than others, but this "color tuning" is often different depending on the adaptation state of the visual system. A given cell that might respond best to long-wavelength light if the light is relatively bright might then become responsive to all wavelengths if the stimulus is relatively dim. Because the color tuning of these cells is not stable, some believe that a different, relatively small, population of neurons in V1 is responsible for color vision. These specialized "color cells" often have receptive fields that can compute local cone ratios. Such "double-opponent" cells were initially described in the goldfish retina by Nigel Daw; their existence in primates was suggested by David H. Hubel and Torsten Wiesel, first demonstrated by C.R. Michael and subsequently confirmed by Bevil Conway. As Margaret Livingstone and David Hubel showed, double opponent cells are clustered within localized regions of V1 called blobs, and are thought to come in two flavors, red–green and blue-yellow. Red–green cells compare the relative amounts of red–green in one part of a scene with the amount of red–green in an adjacent part of the scene, responding best to local color contrast (red next to green). Modeling studies have shown that double-opponent cells are ideal candidates for the neural machinery of color constancy explained by Edwin H. Land in his retinex theory.

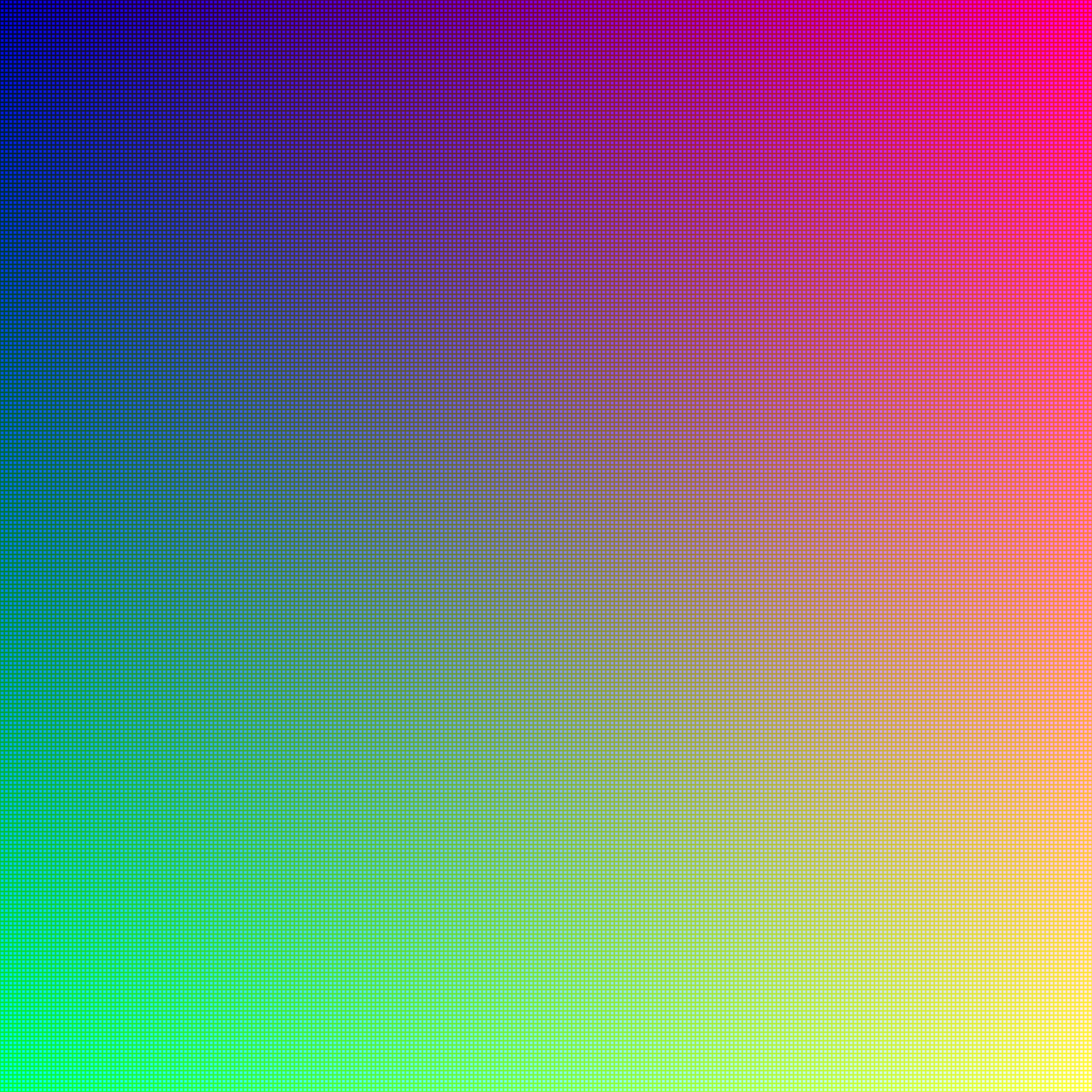
When viewed in full size, this image contains about 16 million pixels, each corresponding to a different color in the full set of RGB colors. The human eye can distinguish about 10 million different colors.

From the V1 blobs, color information is sent to cells in the second visual area, V2. The cells in V2 that are most strongly color tuned are clustered in the "thin stripes" that, like the blobs in V1, stain for the enzyme cytochrome oxidase (separating the thin stripes are interstripes and thick stripes, which seem to be concerned with other visual information like motion and high-resolution form). Neurons in V2 then synapse onto cells in the extended V4. This area includes not only V4, but two other areas in the posterior inferior temporal cortex, anterior to area V3, the dorsal posterior inferior temporal cortex, and posterior TEO. Area V4 was initially suggested by Semir Zeki to be exclusively dedicated to color, and he later showed that V4 can be subdivided into subregions with very high concentrations of color cells separated from each other by zones with lower concentration of such cells though even the latter cells respond better to some wavelengths than to others, a finding confirmed by subsequent studies. The presence in V4 of orientation-selective cells led to the view that V4 is involved in processing both color and form associated with color but it is worth noting that the orientation selective cells within V4 are more broadly tuned than their counterparts in V1, V2 and V3. Color processing in the extended V4 occurs in millimeter-sized color modules called globs. This is the part of the brain in which color is first processed into the full range of hues found in color space.

Anatomical studies have shown that neurons in extended V4 provide input to the inferior temporal lobe. "IT" cortex is thought to integrate color information with shape and form, although it has been difficult to define the appropriate criteria for this claim. Despite this murkiness, it has been useful to characterize this pathway (V1 > V2 > V4 > IT) as the ventral stream or the "what pathway", distinguished from the dorsal stream ("where pathway") that is thought to analyze motion, among other features.

== Subjectivity of color perception ==
Color is a feature of visual perception by an observer. There is a complex relationship between the wavelengths of light in the visual spectrum and human experiences of color. Although most people are assumed to have the same mapping, the philosopher John Locke recognized that alternatives are possible, and described one such hypothetical case with the "inverted spectrum" thought experiment. For example, someone with an inverted spectrum might experience green while seeing 'red' (700 nm) light, and experience red while seeing 'green' (530 nm) light. This inversion has never been demonstrated in experiment, though.

Synesthesia (or ideasthesia) provides some atypical but illuminating examples of subjective color experience triggered by input that is not even light, such as sounds or shapes. The possibility of a clean dissociation between color experience from properties of the world reveals that color is a subjective psychological phenomenon.

The Himba people have been found to categorize colors differently from most Westerners and are able to easily distinguish close shades of green, barely discernible for most people. The Himba have created a very different color scheme which divides the spectrum to dark shades (zuzu in Himba), very light (vapa), vivid blue and green (buru) and dry colors as an adaptation to their specific way of life.

The perception of color depends heavily on the context in which the perceived object is presented.

Psychophysical experiments have shown that color is perceived before the orientation of lines and directional motion by as much as 40ms and 80 ms respectively, thus leading to a perceptual asynchrony that is demonstrable with brief presentation times.

=== Chromatic adaptation ===
In color vision, chromatic adaptation refers to color constancy; the ability of the visual system to preserve the appearance of an object under a wide range of light sources. For example, a white page under blue, pink, or purple light will reflect mostly blue, pink, or purple light to the eye, respectively; the brain, however, compensates for the effect of lighting (based on the color shift of surrounding objects) and is more likely to interpret the page as white under all three conditions, a phenomenon known as color constancy.

In color science, chromatic adaptation is the estimation of the representation of an object under a different light source from the one in which it was recorded. A common application is to find a chromatic adaptation transform (CAT) that will make the recording of a neutral object appear neutral (color balance), while keeping other colors also looking realistic. For example, chromatic adaptation transforms are used when converting images between ICC profiles with different white points. Adobe Photoshop, for example, uses the Bradford CAT.

== Color vision in nonhumans ==
Many species can see light with frequencies outside the visible spectrum. Bees and many other insects can detect ultraviolet light, which helps them to find nectar in flowers. Plant species that depend on insect pollination may owe reproductive success to ultraviolet "colors" and patterns rather than how colorful they appear to humans. Birds, too, can see into the ultraviolet (300–400 nm), and some have sex-dependent markings on their plumage that are visible only in the ultraviolet range. Many animals that can see into the ultraviolet range, however, cannot see red light or any other reddish wavelengths. For example, bees' visible spectrum ends at about 590 nm, just before the orange wavelengths start. Birds, however, can see some red wavelengths, although not as far into the light spectrum as humans. It is a myth that the common goldfish is the only animal that can see both infrared and ultraviolet light; their color vision extends into the ultraviolet but not the infrared.

The basis for this variation is the number of cone types that differ between species. Mammals, in general, have a color vision of a limited type, and usually have red–green color blindness, with only two types of cones. Humans, some primates, and some marsupials see an extended range of colors, but only by comparison with other mammals. Most non-mammalian vertebrate species distinguish different colors at least as well as humans, and many species of birds, fish, reptiles, and amphibians, and some invertebrates, have more than three cone types and probably superior color vision to humans.

In most Catarrhini (Old World monkeys and apes—primates closely related to humans), there are three types of color receptors (known as cone cells), resulting in trichromatic color vision. These primates, like humans, are known as trichromats. Many other primates (including New World monkeys) and other mammals are dichromats, which is the general color vision state for mammals that are active during the day (i.e., felines, canines, ungulates). Nocturnal mammals may have little or no color vision. Trichromat non-primate mammals are rare.

Many invertebrates have color vision. Honeybees and bumblebees have trichromatic color vision which is usually insensitive to red (Note: however, there are exceptions) but sensitive to ultraviolet. The Solitary Bee Osmia rufa, for example, possess a trichromatic color system, which they use in foraging for pollen from flowers. In view of the importance of color vision to bees one might expect these receptor sensitivities to reflect their specific visual ecology; for example the types of flowers that they visit. However, the main groups of hymenopteran insects excluding ants (i.e., bees, wasps and sawflies) mostly have three types of photoreceptor, with spectral sensitivities similar to the honeybee's. Papilio butterflies possess six types of photoreceptors and may have pentachromatic vision. The most complex color vision system in the animal kingdom has been found in stomatopods (such as the mantis shrimp) having between 12 and 16 spectral receptor types thought to work as multiple dichromatic units.

Vertebrate animals such as tropical fish and birds sometimes have more complex color vision systems than humans; thus the many subtle colors they exhibit generally serve as direct signals for other fish or birds, and not to signal mammals. In bird vision, tetrachromacy is achieved through up to four cone types, depending on species. Each single cone contains one of the four main types of vertebrate cone photopigment (LWS/ MWS, RH2, SWS2 and SWS1) and has a colored oil droplet in its inner segment. Brightly colored oil droplets inside the cones shift or narrow the spectral sensitivity of the cell. Pigeons may be pentachromats.

Reptiles and amphibians also have four cone types (occasionally five), and probably see at least the same number of colors that humans do, or perhaps more. In addition, some nocturnal geckos and frogs have the capability of seeing color in dim light. At least some color-guided behaviors in amphibians have also been shown to be wholly innate, developing even in visually deprived animals.

In the evolution of mammals, segments of color vision were lost, then for a few species of primates, regained by gene duplication. Eutherian mammals other than primates (for example, dogs, mammalian farm animals) generally have less-effective two-receptor (dichromatic) color perception systems, which distinguish blue, green, and yellow—but cannot distinguish oranges and reds. There is some evidence that a few mammals, such as cats, have redeveloped the ability to distinguish longer wavelength colors, in at least a limited way, via one-amino-acid mutations in opsin genes. The adaptation to see reds is particularly important for primate mammals, since it leads to the identification of fruits, and also newly sprouting reddish leaves, which are particularly nutritious.

However, even among primates, full color vision differs between New World and Old World monkeys. Old World primates, including monkeys and all apes, have vision similar to humans. New World monkeys may or may not have color sensitivity at this level: in most species, males are dichromats, and about 60% of females are trichromats, but the owl monkeys are cone monochromats, and both sexes of howler monkeys are trichromats. Visual sensitivity differences between males and females in a single species is due to the gene for yellow-green sensitive opsin protein (which confers ability to differentiate red from green) residing on the X sex chromosome.

Several marsupials, such as the fat-tailed dunnart (Sminthopsis crassicaudata), have trichromatic color vision.

Most marine mammals, adapted for low-light vision, have only a single cone type and are thus monochromats, except Sirenians (manatees and dugongs) who retain two cone types.

== Evolution ==
Color perception mechanisms are highly dependent on evolutionary factors, of which the most prominent is thought to be satisfactory recognition of food sources. In herbivorous primates, color perception is essential for finding proper (immature) leaves. In hummingbirds, particular flower types are often recognized by color as well. On the other hand, nocturnal mammals have less-developed color vision since adequate light is needed for cones to function properly. There is evidence that ultraviolet light plays a part in color perception in many branches of the animal kingdom, especially insects. In general, the optical spectrum encompasses the most common electronic transitions in matter and is therefore the most useful for collecting information about the environment.

The evolution of trichromatic color vision in primates occurred as the ancestors of modern monkeys, apes, and humans switched to diurnal (daytime) activity and began consuming fruits and leaves from flowering plants. Color vision, with UV discrimination, is also present in a number of arthropods—the only terrestrial animals besides the vertebrates to possess this trait.

Some animals can distinguish colors in the ultraviolet spectrum. The UV spectrum falls outside the human visible range, except for some cataract surgery patients. Birds, turtles, lizards, many fish and some rodents have UV receptors in their retinas. These animals can see the UV patterns found on flowers and other wildlife that are otherwise invisible to the human eye.

Ultraviolet vision is an especially important adaptation in birds. It allows birds to spot small prey from a distance, navigate, avoid predators, and forage while flying at high speeds. Birds also utilize their broad spectrum vision to recognize other birds, and in sexual selection.

== Mathematics of color perception ==
A "physical color" is a combination of pure spectral colors (in the visible range). In principle there exist infinitely many distinct spectral colors, and so the set of all physical colors may be thought of as an infinite-dimensional vector space (a Hilbert space). This space is typically notated H_{color}. More technically, the space of physical colors may be considered to be the topological cone over the simplex whose vertices are the spectral colors, with white at the centroid of the simplex, black at the apex of the cone, and the monochromatic color associated with any given vertex somewhere along the line from that vertex to the apex depending on its brightness.

An element C of H_{color} is a function from the range of visible wavelengths—considered as an interval of real numbers [W_{min},W_{max}]—to the real numbers, assigning to each wavelength w in [W_{min},W_{max}] its intensity C(w).

A humanly perceived color may be modeled as three numbers: the extents to which each of the 3 types of cones is stimulated. Thus a humanly perceived color may be thought of as a point in 3-dimensional Euclidean space. We call this space R^{3}_{color}.

Since each wavelength w stimulates each of the 3 types of cone cells to a known extent, these extents may be represented by 3 functions s(w), m(w), l(w) corresponding to the response of the S, M, and L cone cells, respectively.

Finally, since a beam of light can be composed of many different wavelengths, to determine the extent to which a physical color C in H_{color} stimulates each cone cell, we must calculate the integral (with respect to w), over the interval [W_{min},W_{max}], of C(w)·s(w), of C(w)·m(w), and of C(w)·l(w). The triple of resulting numbers associates with each physical color C (which is an element in H_{color}) a particular perceived color (which is a single point in R^{3}_{color}). This association is easily seen to be linear. It may also easily be seen that many different elements in the "physical" space H_{color} can all result in the same single perceived color in R^{3}_{color}, so a perceived color is not unique to one physical color.

Thus human color perception is determined by a specific, non-unique linear mapping from the infinite-dimensional Hilbert space H_{color} to the 3-dimensional Euclidean space R^{3}_{color}.

Technically, the image of the (mathematical) cone over the simplex whose vertices are the spectral colors, by this linear mapping, is also a (mathematical) cone in R^{3}_{color}. Moving directly away from the vertex of this cone represents maintaining the same chromaticity while increasing its intensity. Taking a cross-section of this cone yields a 2D chromaticity space. Both the 3D cone and its projection or cross-section are convex sets; that is, any mixture of spectral colors is also a color.

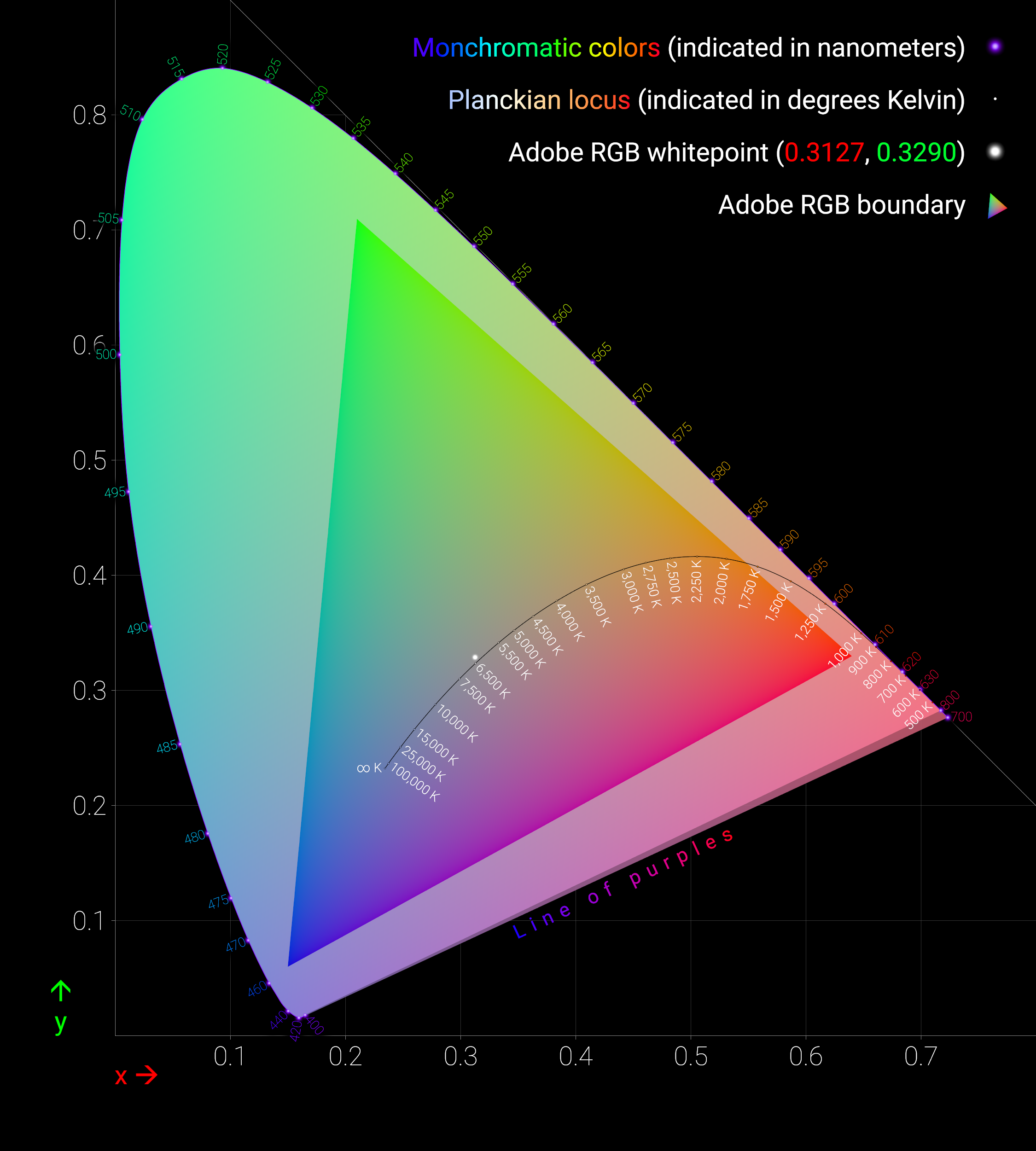
The CIE 1931 xy chromaticity diagram with a triangle showing the gamut of the Adobe RGB color space. The Planckian locus is shown with color temperatures labeled in kelvins. The outer curved boundary is the spectral locus, with wavelengths shown in nanometers. Note that the colors in this file are specified in Adobe RGB. Areas outside the triangle cannot be accurately rendered because they are out of the gamut of Adobe RGB, therefore they have been interpreted. Note that the colors depicted depend on the color space of the device you use to view the image (number of colors on your monitor, etc.), and may not be a strictly accurate representation of the color at a particular position.

In practice, it would be quite difficult to physiologically measure an individual's three cone responses to various physical color stimuli. Instead, a psychophysical approach is taken. Three specific benchmark test lights are typically used; let us call them S, M, and L. To calibrate human perceptual space, scientists allowed human subjects to try to match any physical color by turning dials to create specific combinations of intensities (I_{S}, I_{M}, I_{L}) for the S, M, and L lights, resp., until a match was found. This needed only to be done for physical colors that are spectral, since a linear combination of spectral colors will be matched by the same linear combination of their (I_{S}, I_{M}, I_{L}) matches. Note that in practice, often at least one of S, M, L would have to be added with some intensity to the physical test color, and that combination matched by a linear combination of the remaining 2 lights. Across different individuals (without color blindness), the matchings turned out to be nearly identical.

By considering all the resulting combinations of intensities (I_{S}, I_{M}, I_{L}) as a subset of 3-space, a model for human perceptual color space is formed. (Note that when one of S, M, L had to be added to the test color, its intensity was counted as negative.) Again, this turns out to be a (mathematical) cone, not a quadric, but rather all rays through the origin in 3-space passing through a certain convex set. Again, this cone has the property that moving directly away from the origin corresponds to increasing the intensity of the S, M, L lights proportionately. Again, a cross-section of this cone is a planar shape that is (by definition) the space of "chromaticities" (informally: distinct colors); one particular such cross-section, corresponding to constant X+Y+Z of the CIE 1931 color space, gives the CIE chromaticity diagram.

This system implies that for any hue or non-spectral color not on the boundary of the chromaticity diagram, there are infinitely many distinct physical spectra that are all perceived as that hue or color. So, in general, there is no such thing as the combination of spectral colors that we perceive as (say) a specific version of tan; instead, there are infinitely many possibilities that produce that exact color. The boundary colors that are pure spectral colors can be perceived only in response to light that is purely at the associated wavelength, while the boundary colors on the "line of purples" can each only be generated by a specific ratio of the pure violet and the pure red at the ends of the visible spectral colors.

The CIE chromaticity diagram is horseshoe-shaped, with its curved edge corresponding to all spectral colors (the spectral locus), and the remaining straight edge corresponding to the most saturated purples, mixtures of red and violet.

== See also ==
- Achromatopsia
- Color theory
- The dress
