= PDE6C =

Protein-coding gene in the species Homo sapiens

Available structures
PDB	Ortholog search: PDBe RCSB
PDB	List of PDB id codes 3JWQ, 3JWR, 5E8F

Identifiers
- Aliases: PDE6C, ACHM5, COD4, PDEA2, phosphodiesterase 6C
- External IDs: OMIM: 600827; MGI: 105956; HomoloGene: 4521; GeneCards: PDE6C; OMA:PDE6C - orthologs

Gene location (Human)
Chr.	Chromosome 10 (human)
Band	10q23.33	Start	93,612,537 bp
Band	10q23.33	End	93,666,010 bp

Gene location (Mouse)
Chr.	Chromosome 19 (mouse)
Band	19|19 C2	Start	38,121,229 bp
Band	19|19 C2	End	38,172,406 bp
RNA expression pattern
Bgee	Human / Mouse (ortholog); Top expressed in: secondary oocyte; testicle; cerebellar hemisphere; right hemisphere of cerebellum; ectocervix; tibial nerve; right lung; gastrocnemius muscle; canal of the cervix; body of uterus / Top expressed in: neural layer of retina; pineal gland; epithelium of lens; yolk sac; retinal pigment epithelium; choroid plexus of fourth ventricle; embryo; liver; primitive streak; iris; More reference expression data
BioGPS	n/a
Gene ontology
Molecular function	phosphoric diester hydrolase activity; nucleotide binding; cGMP binding; 3',5'-cyclic-GMP phosphodiesterase activity; hydrolase activity; 3',5'-cyclic-nucleotide phosphodiesterase activity; metal ion binding
Cellular component	plasma membrane; membrane
Biological process	sensory perception of light stimulus; retinal cone cell development; signal transduction; visual perception; phototransduction, visible light; response to stimulus
Sources:Amigo / QuickGO
Orthologs
Species	Human	Mouse
Entrez	5146	110855
Ensembl	ENSG00000095464	ENSMUSG00000024992
UniProt	P51160	Q91ZQ1
RefSeq (mRNA)	NM_006204	NM_001170959; NM_033614
RefSeq (protein)	NP_006195	NP_001164430; NP_291092
Location (UCSC)	Chr 10: 93.61 – 93.67 Mb	Chr 19: 38.12 – 38.17 Mb
PubMed search
- Wikidata
View/Edit Human	View/Edit Mouse

Cone cGMP-specific 3',5'-cyclic phosphodiesterase subunit alpha' is an enzyme that in humans is encoded by the PDE6C gene.
