= Mesopic vision =

Ability to see in low light conditions

Mesopic vision, sometimes also called twilight vision, is a combination of photopic and scotopic vision under low-light (but not necessarily dark) conditions. Mesopic levels range approximately from 0.01 to 3.0 cd/m^{2} in luminance. Most nighttime outdoor and street lighting conditions are in the mesopic range.

Human eyes respond to certain light levels differently. This is because under high light levels typical during daytime (photopic vision), the eye uses cones to process light. Under very low light levels, corresponding to moonless nights without artificial lighting (scotopic vision), the eye uses rods to process light. At many nighttime levels, a combination of both cones and rods supports vision. Photopic vision facilitates excellent color perception, whereas colors are barely perceptible under scotopic vision. Mesopic vision falls between these two extremes. In most nighttime environments, enough ambient light prevents true scotopic vision.

In the words of Duco Schreuder:

There is not one single luminescence value where photopic vision and scotopic vision meet. [Rather,] there is a wide zone of transition between them. Because it is between photopic and scotopic vision, it is usually called the zone of mesopic vision. The reason that the zone of mesopic vision exists is because the activities of neither cones nor rods is simply switched 'on' or 'off'. There are reasons to believe that the cones and the rods both operate in all luminescence conditions.

As a result of gradually switching from cones to rods in processing light, a number of visual effects occur:

- The rods have a different wavelength sensitivity, causing blue objects to appear brighter and red objects to appear darker. This is called the "Purkinje shift".
- Color appears desaturated and hues change, drifting towards a dull purple.
- Spatial acuity decreases linearly with log-luminance. A varying "noise" slowly becomes more prominent.

Cinematographers intentionally emulate mesopic effects to make scenes look darker than a display can actually achieve.

== Photometry ==
The traditional method of measuring light assumes photopic vision and is often a poor predictor of how a person sees at night. Typically research in this area has focused on improving street and outdoor lighting as well as aviation lighting.

Prior to 1951, there was no standard for scotopic photometry (light measurement); all measurements were based on the photopic spectral sensitivity function V(λ) which was defined in 1924. In 1951, the International Commission on Illumination (CIE) established the scotopic luminous efficiency function, V'(λ). However, there was still no system of mesopic photometry. This lack of a proper measurement system can lead to difficulties in relating light measurements under mesopic luminances to visibility. Due to this deficiency, the CIE established a special technical committee (TC 1-58) for collecting the results of mesopic visual performance research.

Two very similar measurement systems were created to bridge the scotopic and photopic luminous efficiency functions, creating a unified system of photometry. This new measurement has been well-received because the reliance on V(λ) alone for characterizing night-time light illumination can result in the use of more electric energy than might otherwise be needed. The energy-savings potential of using a new way to measure mesopic lighting scenarios is significant; superior performance could in certain cases be achieved with as much as 30 to 50% reduction in the energy use comparing to the high pressure sodium lights.

=== Mesopic luminosity function ===
The mesoscopic luminosity function at wavelength $\lambda$ can be written as the weighted sum,

$$V_m(\lambda) = (1-x) V'(\lambda) + x V(\lambda)$$,

where $V(\lambda)$ is the standard photopic luminosity function (peaking at 683 lm/W at 555 nm) and $V'(\lambda)$ is the scotopic luminosity function (peaking at approx. 1700 lm/W at 507 nm), and standardized by CIE and ISO. The parameter $x$ is a function of the photopic luminance $L_p$. Various weighting functions are in use, for blue-heavy and red-heavy light sources, as proposed by two organizations, MOVE and Lighting Research Center (LRC).

MOVE and LRC weighting factors
L_{p}	Blue-heavy		Red-heavy	
(cd/m^{2})	MOVE	LRC	MOVE	LRC
0.01	0.13	0.04	0.00	0.01
0.1	0.42	0.28	0.34	0.11
1.0	0.70	1.00	0.68	1.00
10	0.98	1.00	0.98	1.00

Note that the L_{p}–x curves defined by the two organizations have very different shapes. The weighted function is intended to define "visual effectiveness", i.e. how helpful a light source is in helping human spot an object, rather than any perceived level of luminance. Variation in how this "effectiveness" is rated causes variation of weights.

== See also ==
- Spectral sensitivity – Relative efficiency of detecting a signal as a function of its frequency or wavelength
