= Photopic vision =

Visual perception under well-lit conditions

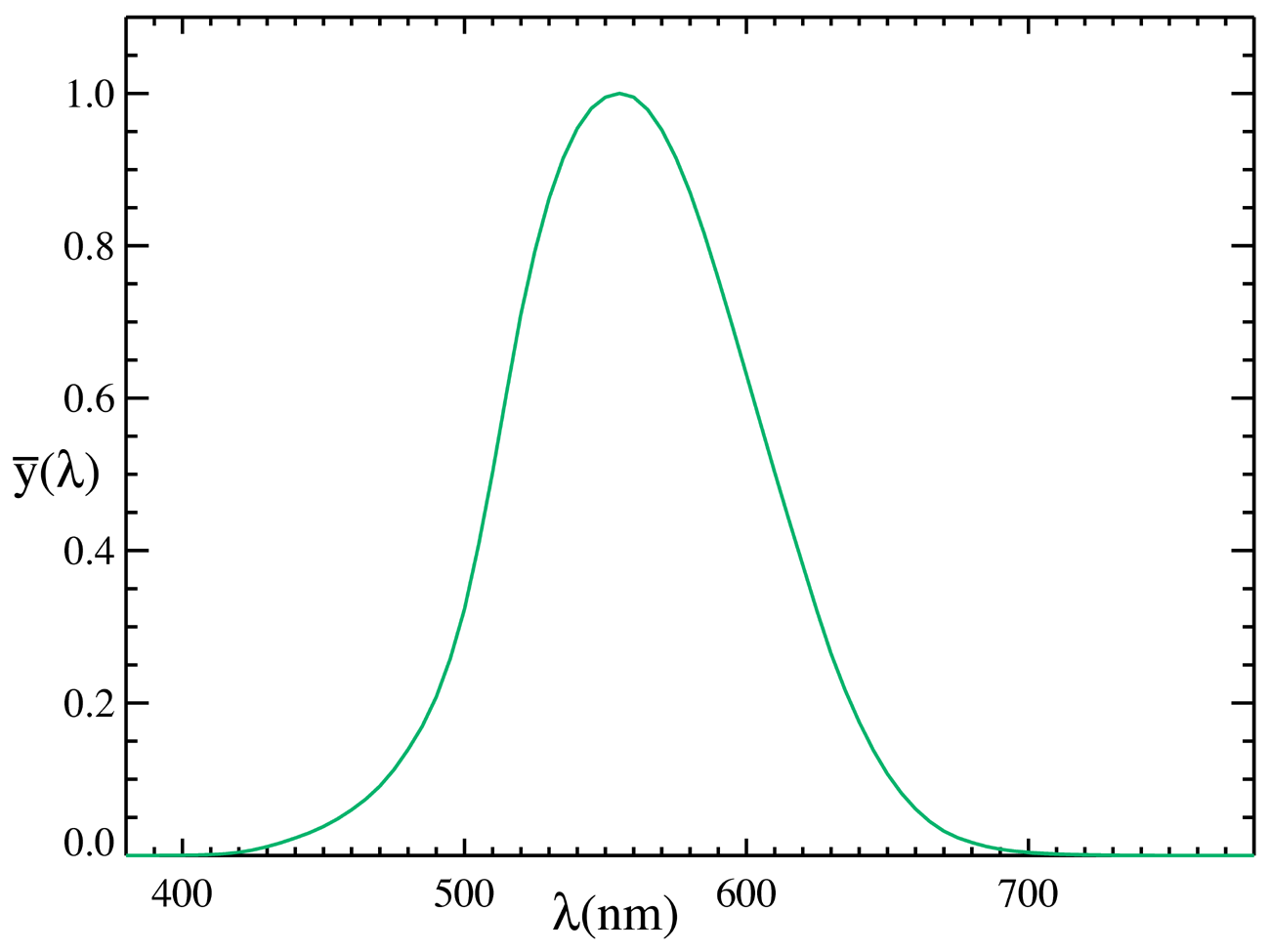
The 1931 CIE photopic luminosity function. The horizontal axis is wavelength in nanometres.

Photopic vision is the vision of the eye under well-lit conditions (luminance levels from 10 to 10^{8} cd/m^{2}). In humans and many other animals, photopic vision allows color perception, mediated by cone cells, and a significantly higher visual acuity and temporal resolution than available with scotopic vision.

The human eye uses three types of cones to sense light in three bands of color. The biological pigments of the cones have maximum absorption values at wavelengths of about 420 nm (blue), 534 nm (bluish-green), and 564 nm (yellowish-green). The color of the pure signal of the cones could be described as violet, blue-green, and scarlet red, respectively, but, in their wavelengths of maximum absorption other cones are activated as well. The sensitivity ranges of the cone cells overlap to provide vision throughout the visible spectrum. The maximum efficacy is 683 lm/W at a wavelength of 555 nm (green). By definition, light at a frequency of 5.4×10^{14} hertz (λ = 555.17... nm) has a luminous efficacy of 683 lm/W.

The wavelengths for when a person is in photopic vary with the intensity of light. For the blue-green region (500 nm), 50% of the light reaches the image point of the retina.

Adaptation is much faster under photopic vision; it can occur in 5 minutes for photopic vision but it can take 30 minutes to transition from photopic to scotopic.

Most older adult humans lose photopic spatial contrast sensitivity. Adults in their 70s tend to require about 30–60% more contrast to detect high spatial frequencies than adults in their 20s.

The human eye uses scotopic vision under low-light conditions (luminance level 10^{−6} to 10^{−3.5} cd/m^{2}), and mesopic vision in intermediate conditions (luminance level 10^{−3} to 10^{0.5} cd/m^{2}).

== See also ==
- Adaptation (eye)
- Candela
- Cone cell
- Contrast (vision)
- Mesopic vision
- Night vision
- Purkinje effect
- Photometry (optics)
- Photosensitive ganglion cell
- Scotopic vision
- Spectral sensitivity
