= Scotopic vision =

Visual perception under low-light conditions

In vision science, scotopic vision or scotopia is the visual perception of the eyes under low-light conditions. The term comes from the Greek skotos, meaning 'darkness', and -opia, meaning 'a condition of sight'. In the human eye, cone cells are nonfunctional in low visible light. Scotopic vision is produced exclusively through rod cells, which are most sensitive to wavelengths of around 498 nm (blue-green) and are insensitive to wavelengths longer than about 640 nm. Under scotopic conditions, light incident on the retina is not encoded in terms of the spectral power distribution. Higher visual perception occurs under scotopic vision as it does under photopic vision.

== Retinal circuitry ==
Of the two types of photoreceptor cells in the retina, rods dominate scotopic vision. This dominance is due to the increased sensitivity of the photopigment molecule expressed in rods, as opposed to those in cones. Rods signal light increments to rod bipolar cells which, unlike most types of bipolar cells, do not form direct connections with retinal ganglion cells – the output neurons of the retina. Instead, two types of amacrine cell – AII and A17 – allow lateral information flow from rod bipolar cells to cone bipolar cells, which in turn contact ganglion cells. Thus, rod signals, mediated by amacrine cells, dominate scotopic vision.

== Occurrence ==
Scotopic vision occurs at luminance levels of 10^{−3} to 10^{−6} cd/m^{2}. Other species are not universally color blind in low-light conditions. The elephant hawk-moth (Deilephila elpenor) displays advanced color discrimination even in dim starlight.

Mesopic vision occurs in intermediate lighting conditions (luminance level 10^{−3} to 10^{0.5} cd/m^{2}) and is effectively a combination of scotopic and photopic vision. This gives inaccurate visual acuity and color discrimination.

In normal light (luminance level 10 to 10^{8} cd/m^{2}), the vision of cone cells dominates and is photopic vision. There is good visual acuity (VA) and color discrimination.

== Wavelength sensitivity ==
The CIE 1951 scotopic luminosity function. The horizontal axis is wavelength in nm.

The normal human observer's relative wavelength sensitivity will not change due to background illumination under scotopic vision. The wavelength sensitivity is determined by the rhodopsin photopigment. This is a red pigment seen at the back of the eye in animals that have a white background to their eye called tapetum lucidum. The pigment is not noticeable under photopic and mesopic conditions. The principle that the wavelength sensitivity does not change during scotopic vision led to the ability to detect two functional cone classes in individuals. If two cone classes are present, then their relative sensitivity will change the behavioral wavelength sensitivity. Therefore, experimentation can determine "the presence of two cone classes by measuring wavelength sensitivity on two different backgrounds and noting a change in the observer's relative wavelength sensitivity."

The behavior of the rhodopsin photopigment explains why the human eye cannot resolve lights with different spectral power distributions under low light. The reaction of this single photopigment will give the same quanta for 400 nm light and 700 nm light. Therefore, this photopigment only maps the rate of absorption and does not encode information about the relative spectral composition of the light.

In scientific literature, one occasionally encounters the term scotopic lux which corresponds to photopic lux, but uses instead the scotopic visibility weighting function. The scotopic luminosity function is a standard function established by the Commission Internationale de l'Éclairage (CIE) and standardized in collaboration with the ISO.

The maximum scotopic efficacy is 1700 lm/W at 507 nm (compared with 683 lm/W at 555 nm for maximum photopic efficacy). While the ratio between scotopic and photopic efficacies is only around 2.5 counted at peak sensitivity the ratio increases strongly below 500 nm.

== Resolution ==
For adaptation to occur at very low levels, the human eye needs to have a large sample of light across the signal in order to get a reliable image. This leads to the human eye being unable to resolve high spatial frequencies in low light since the observer is spatially averaging the light signal.

Another reason that vision is poor under scotopic vision is that rods, which are the only cells active under scotopic vision, converge to a smaller number of neurons in the retina. This many-to-one ratio leads to poor spatial frequency sensitivity.

== General perception ==
High-level visual perception is similar with scotopic as with photopic sight with people reading with unimpaired accuracy (though twice as long fixations), able to recognize faces, and show a face inversion effect.

== See also ==
- Photopic vision – Visual perception under well-lit conditions
- Adaptation (eye) – Response of the eye to light and dark
- Averted vision – Technique for viewing faint objects with peripheral vision
- Mesopic vision – Ability to see in low light conditions
- Night vision – Ability to see in low light conditions
- Purkinje effect – Tendency for sight to shift toward blue colors at low light levels
- Scotopic stilb – Deprecated unit of luminance
- Skot (unit) – Deprecated unit of luminance
- Spatial frequency – Characteristic of any structure that is periodic across a position in space
- Spectral sensitivity – Relative efficiency of detecting a signal as a function of its frequency or wavelength
