= OPN1MW2 =

Human protein

Identifiers
- Aliases: OPN1MW2, GOP, opsin 1 (cone pigments), medium-wave-sensitive 2, opsin 1, medium wave sensitive 2
- External IDs: GeneCards: OPN1MW2

Gene location (Human)
Chr.	X chromosome (human)
Band	Xq28	Start	154,219,756 bp
Band	Xq28	End	154,233,286 bp
RNA expression pattern
Bgee	Human / Mouse (ortholog); Top expressed in: gonad; appendix; skin of leg / n/a; More reference expression data
BioGPS	n/a
Gene ontology
Molecular function	G protein-coupled receptor activity; photoreceptor activity; signal transducer activity; G protein-coupled photoreceptor activity
Cellular component	integral component of membrane; plasma membrane; membrane; photoreceptor outer segment; integral component of plasma membrane
Biological process	G protein-coupled receptor signaling pathway; signal transduction; visual perception; response to stimulus; phototransduction; detection of visible light; cellular response to light stimulus
Sources:Amigo / QuickGO
Orthologs
Databases	NCBI: entry; OMA: entry
Species	Human	Mouse
Entrez	728458	n/a
Ensembl	ENSG00000166160	n/a
UniProt	P0DN77	n/a
RefSeq (mRNA)	NM_001048181	n/a
RefSeq (protein)	NP_000504.1; NP_001041646.1; NP_000504; NP_001041646	n/a
Location (UCSC)	Chr X: 154.22 – 154.23 Mb	n/a
PubMed search		n/a
- Wikidata
View/Edit Human

OPN1MW2 is a duplication of the OPN1MW gene, which encodes the medium wavelength sensitive (MWS) photopsin. The gene duplication is present in about 50% of X-chromosomes, so is present in 50% of males and at least once in 75% of females. It is caused by the same mechanism that causes congenital red-green color blindness, the most common form of color blindness.

== Gene Duplication ==
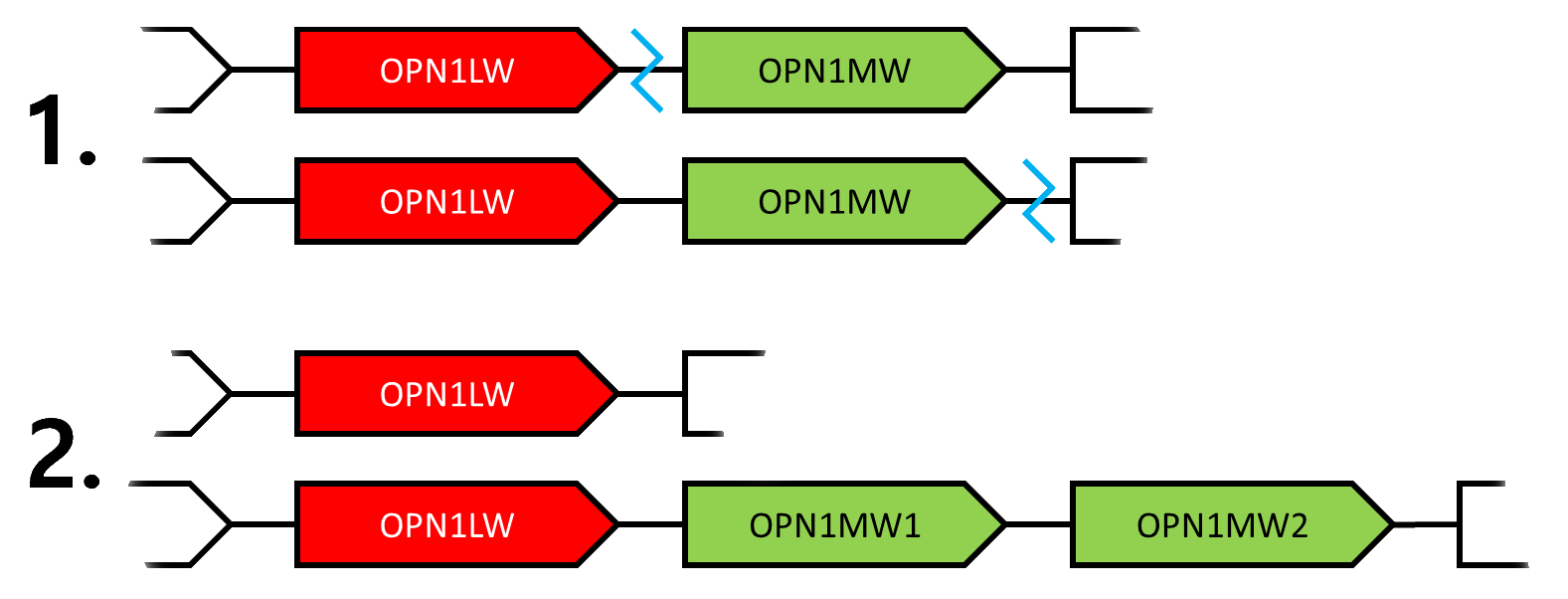
Unequal homologous combination that leads to gene deletion and therefore underlies congenital dichromacy (protanopia and deuteranopia). The third gene array shows a deuteranopia genotype; the fourth shows a normal color vision genotype.

OPN1MW2 is a duplication of the OPN1MW gene arising from unequal homologous recombination. During this process, one of the X-chromosomes "donates" its OPN1MW gene to the other chromosome, resulting in:

- One chromosome without a OPN1MW gene, which carries protanopia
- One chromosome with two OPN1MW genes, although only the first gene in the chain (OPN1MW1) will generally be expressed and the second gene OPN1MW2 will remain unexpressed.

The only difference between the two genes is their position in the gene cluster. They are equal in that they have the same chances of encoding a certain OPN1MW allele. However, in a given X-chromosome, they may encode different alleles.

== Tetrachromacy ==
There are several theories for tetrachromacy in humans, but the most popular theory is related to females carriers of color blindness. Carriers will have one opsin gene (OPN1MW or OPN1LW) with differing alleles thereof on each chromosome, such that the alleles encode proteins with different spectral sensitivities. Both of these alleles are expressed due to x-inactivation (one kind of X chromosome will get expressed in some photoreceptor cells, whereas the other kind of X chromosome will get expressed in the other photoreceptor cells) so a carrier will have 4 distinct cones with different spectral sensitivities, which is one prerequisite of tetrachromacy.

This theory cannot be extended to females who have identical alleles in their OPN1MW1 genes, but a different allele in their OPN1MW2 gene, since the latter is never expressed, and if it were co-expressed with OPN1MW1, the two alleles would not be isolated in different photoreceptors. Therefore the OPN1MW2 gene is not considered a likely candidate mechanism for tetrachromacy.
