= Retinylidene protein =

Family of proteins

Retinylidene proteins, or rhodopsins in a broad sense, are proteins that use retinal as a chromophore for light reception. They are the molecular basis for a variety of light-sensing systems from phototaxis in flagellates to eyesight in animals. Retinylidene proteins include all forms of opsin and rhodopsin (in the broad sense). While rhodopsin in the narrow sense refers to a dim-light visual pigment found in vertebrates, usually on rod cells, rhodopsin in the broad sense (as used here) refers to any molecule consisting of an opsin and a retinal chromophore in the ground state. When activated by light, the chromophore is isomerized, at which point the molecule as a whole is no longer rhodopsin, but a related molecule such as metarhodopsin. However, it remains a retinylidene protein. The chromophore then separates from the opsin, at which point the bare opsin is a retinylidene protein. Thus, the molecule remains a retinylidene protein throughout the phototransduction cycle.

== Structure ==
All rhodopsins consist of two building blocks, a protein moiety and a reversibly covalently bound non-protein cofactor, retinal (retinaldehyde). The protein structure of rhodopsin consists of a bundle of seven transmembrane helices that form an internal pocket binding the photoreactive chromophore. They form a superfamily with other membrane-bound receptors containing seven transmembrane domains, for example odor and chemokine receptors.

== Mechanism of light reception ==
Instead of being activated by binding chemical ligands like their relatives, rhodopsins contain retinal which changes conformation in reaction to light via photoisomerization and thus are activated by light. The retinal molecule can take on several different cis-trans isomeric forms, such as all-trans, 11-cis and 13-cis. Photoisomerization (light-dependent isomerization) of retinal from cis to trans or vice versa induces a conformational change in the receptor protein. This change acts as a molecular switch to activate a signal transduction mechanism within the cell. Depending on the type of rhodopsin, it either opens an ion channel (for example in bacteria) or activates an associated G protein and triggers a second messenger cascade (for example in animal eyes).

== Types of rhodopsins ==
Retinylidene proteins or rhodopsins exist in many species from bacteria to algae and animals. They can be divided into two distinct types based on their sequence as well as the retinal isomer they contain at the ground state and their signal transduction mechanisms.

=== Microbial rhodopsins ===
Like animal rhodopsins, microbial rhodopsins (found in prokaryotes and algae) contain a retinal chromophore and have seven transmembrane alpha helices; however, they are not coupled to a G protein. The retinal chromophore differs from the animal 11-cis form and is an all-trans retinal isomer at the ground state, which isomerizes to 13-cis upon light activation; the chromophore is also known as microbial-type chromophore. Examples are bacterial sensory rhodopsins, channelrhodopsins, bacteriorhodopsins, halorhodopsins, proteorhodopsins, archaerhodopsins, heliorhodopsins and xanthorhodopsins to carry out phototrophy.

They act as light-gated ion channels and can be further distinguished by the type of ion they channel. Bacteriorhodopsin functions as a proton pump, whereas halorhodopsin act as a chloride pump. Their functions range from bacterial photosynthesis (bacteriorhodopsin) to driving phototaxis (channelrhodopsins in flagellates). Signal transduction in phototaxis involves depolarization of the cell membrane.

Unicellular flagellate algae contain channelrhodopsins that act as light-gated cation channels when expressed in heterologous systems. Many other pro- and eukaryotic organisms (in particular, fungi such as Neurospora) express rhodopsin ion pumps or sensory rhodopsins of yet-unknown function. Very recently, microbial rhodopsins with guanylyl cyclase activity have been discovered. While all microbial rhodopsins have significant sequence homology to one another, they have no detectable sequence homology to the G-protein-coupled receptor (GPCR) family to which animal visual rhodopsins belong. Nevertheless, microbial rhodopsins and GPCRs are possibly evolutionarily related, based on the similarity of their three-dimensional structures. Therefore, they have been assigned to the same superfamily in Structural Classification of Proteins (SCOP).

=== G protein-coupled receptors ===
The retinylidene proteins of the animal kingdom are also referred to as opsins. Vertebrates contain five subfamilies of (rhod)opsins and arthropods three subfamilies. Opsins belong to the class of G protein-coupled receptors and bind an 11-cis isomer of retinal at the ground state that photoisomerizes to an all-trans retinal upon light activation. They are commonly found in the light-sensing organs, for example in the photoreceptor cells of vertebrate retina where they facilitate eyesight. Animal opsins can also be found in the skin of amphibians, the pineal glands of lizards and birds, the hypothalamus of toads, and the human brain. They can be categorized into several distinct classes including:

- visual opsins (classical rhodopsin and relatives),
- melanopsins
- peropsins
- neuropsins
- encephalopsins

==== Visual perception ====
The "visual purple" rhodopsin (opsin-2) of the rod cells in the vertebrate retina absorbs green-blue light. The photopsins of the cone cells of the retina differ in a few amino acids resulting in a shift of their light absorption spectra. The three human photopsins absorb yellowish-green (photopsin I), green (photopsin II), and bluish-violet (photopsin III) light and are the basis of color vision, whereas the more light-sensitive "visual purple" is responsible for the monochromatic vision in the dark. Light signal transduction involves an enzyme cascade of G-proteins (transducin), cGMP phosphodiesterase, closure of a cation channel and ultimately hyperpolarization of the visual photoreceptor cell.

The visual rhodopsins of arthropods and molluscs differ from the vertebrate proteins in their signal transduction cascade involving G-proteins, phospholipase C, and ultimately depolarization of the visual photoreceptor cell.

==== Others ====
Other opsins found in humans include encephalopsin (or panopsin, opsin-3), melanopsin (opsin-4), neuropsin (opsin-5) and peropsin. Melanopsin is involved in the light entrainment of the circadian clock in vertebrates. Encephalopsins and neuropsins are highly expressed in nerve cells and brain tissue, but so far their function is unknown. Peropsin binds all-trans retinal (microbial-type chromophore) and might function as a photoisomerase to return retinal to the 11-cis isomer form needed in visual perception.

== See also ==
- Opsin
- Rhodopsin
- Visual cycle
- Visual phototransduction
- Microbial rhodopsin
