= RGR =

RGR can refer to:

- Royal Gurkha Rifles
- Retinal G protein coupled receptor, a protein encoded by the gene RGR
- Relative growth rate (speed of plant growth)]
- The stock ticker for Sturm, Ruger & Co., Inc.
- Rally of Republican Lefts (Rassemblement des gauches républicaines)
