= RRH (disambiguation) =

RRH is the human gene that encodes the visual pigment-like receptor Peropsin.

RRH may also refer to:

- Rrh (trigraph)
- Remote Radar Head, a network of sites used by the British RAF
- Remote radio head, a type of radio used in wireless telecommunications networks
- Regesta Regni Hierosolymitani, an 1893 history of the Crusades by Reinhold Röhricht
