= Cyanobacteriochrome =

Proteins only found in cyanobacteria

Cyanobacteriochromes are phytochrome-related photoreceptor proteins found only in cyanobacteria.

== Molecular characterization ==
Cyanobacteriochrome covalently binds a linear tetrapyrrole molecule in the GAF domain. The A-ring of linear tetrapyrrole molecule is anchored at cysteine residue in the GAF domain via thioether bond. The GAF domain of cyanobacteriochrome is related to phytochrome GAF, however, These GAF domains are distinct. A second cysteine linkage to the tetrapyrrole is found in some cyanobacteriochrome GAF domains resulting in blue-green photo reversible light sensitivity

== Spectral properties ==
They perform reversible photoconversion between green(~530 nm)- and red-(~660 nm) absorbing forms or between blue(~430 nm)- and green-absorbing forms. These spectral properties significantly differ from that of phytochrome which photoconverts between red- and far-red(~700 nm)-absorbing forms.

== Examples of cyanobacteriochrome domain containing proteins ==
One protein, which contains a cyanobacteriochrome as well as a phytochrome-like photosensory module is the protein called "Cph2" from Synechocystis sp. PCC 6803. The phytochrome-like domains switch between a red and a far-red absorbing form, the cyanobacteriochrome domain switches between a green- and a blue-absorbing form (Ref.: "Light‐induced alteration of c‐di‐GMP level controls motility of Synechocystis sp. PCC 6803", Philipp Savakis, Sven De Causmaecker, Veronika Angerer, Ulrike Ruppert, Katrin Anders, Lars‐Oliver Essen, Annegret Wilde; Molecular Microbiology, 2012, 85(2), 239–251.).
