= OPN3 =

Protein-coding gene in humans

Identifiers
- Aliases: OPN3, ECPN, PPP1R116, opsin 3
- External IDs: OMIM: 606695; MGI: 1338022; GeneCards: OPN3

Gene location (Mouse)
Chr.	Chromosome 1 (mouse)
Band	1|1 H3	Start	175,489,987 bp
Band	1|1 H3	End	175,520,342 bp
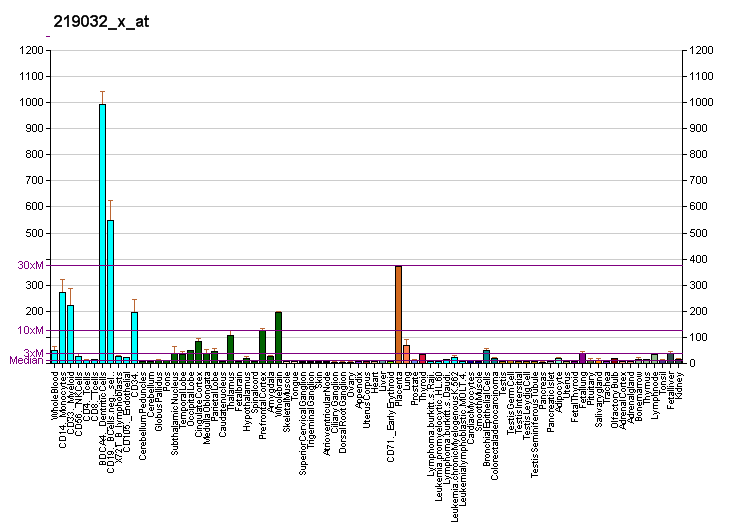
RNA expression pattern
Bgee	Human / Mouse (ortholog); Top expressed in: middle temporal gyrus; placenta; tibia; Brodmann area 46; palpebral conjunctiva; visceral pleura; prefrontal cortex; amniotic fluid; Brodmann area 23; monocyte / Top expressed in: white adipose tissue; vestibular membrane of cochlear duct; motor neuron; subcutaneous adipose tissue; lateral geniculate nucleus; medial geniculate nucleus; secondary oocyte; primary oocyte; seminiferous tubule; spinal ganglia; More reference expression data
BioGPS	More reference expression data
Gene ontology
Molecular function	G protein-coupled receptor activity; photoreceptor activity; signal transducer activity; G protein-coupled photoreceptor activity
Cellular component	integral component of membrane; integral component of plasma membrane; membrane; photoreceptor outer segment
Biological process	G protein-coupled receptor signaling pathway; regulation of circadian rhythm; signal transduction; response to stimulus; detection of light stimulus; detection of visible light; phototransduction; cellular response to light stimulus
Sources:Amigo / QuickGO
Orthologs
Databases	NCBI: entry
Species	Human	Mouse
Entrez	23596	13603
Ensembl	n/a	ENSMUSG00000026525
UniProt	Q9H1Y3	Q9WUK7
RefSeq (mRNA)	NM_014322; NM_001030011; NM_001030012; NM_001381855; NM_001381856	NM_010098
RefSeq (protein)	NP_055137; NP_001368784; NP_001368785	NP_034228
Location (UCSC)	n/a	Chr 1: 175.49 – 175.52 Mb
PubMed search
- Wikidata
View/Edit Human	View/Edit Mouse

Opsin-3 also known as encephalopsin or panopsin is a protein that, in humans, is encoded by the OPN3 gene. Alternative splicing of this gene results in multiple transcript variants encoding different protein isoforms.

== Function ==
Opsins are members of the G protein-coupled receptor superfamily. In addition to the visual opsins, mammals possess several photoreceptive non-visual opsins that are expressed in tissues outside the eye. The opsin-3 gene is strongly expressed in brain and testis and weakly expressed in liver, placenta, heart, lung, skeletal muscle, kidney, and pancreas. The gene is expressed in the skin and may also be expressed in the retina. The protein has the canonical features of a photoreceptive opsin protein, however in human skin, OPN3 is not photoreceptive and acts as a negative regulator of melanogenesis.

== Applications ==
When OPN3 analogues are expressed in neurons, activation by light inhibits neurotransmitter release. This makes these analogues useful tools for optogenetic silencing, a method to study the impact of specific neurons on brain function.
