= UVR8 =

UVB-resistance protein UVR8
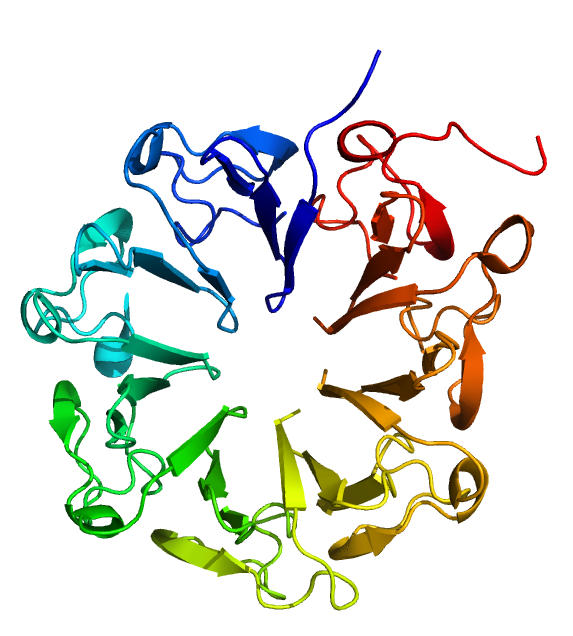
- Crystal structure of UVB-resistance protein UVR8.

Identifiers
- Organism: Arabidopsis thaliana
- Symbol: UVR8
- Entrez: 836506
- PDB: 4DNW More structures
- RefSeq (mRNA): NM_125781
- RefSeq (Prot): NP_201191
- UniProt: Q9XHD7

Other data
- Chromosome: 5: 25.55 - 25.56 Mb
Search for
- Structures: Swiss-model
- Domains: InterPro

UV-B resistance 8 (UVR8) also known as ultraviolet-B receptor UVR8 is an UV-B – sensing protein found in plants and possibly other sources. It is responsible for sensing ultraviolet light in the range 280-315 nm and initiating the plant stress response. It is most sensitive at 285nm, near the lower limit of UVB. UVR8 was first identified as a crucial mediator of a plant's response to UV-B in Arabidopsis thaliana containing a mutation in this protein. This plant was found to have a hypersensitivity to UV-B which damages DNA. UVR8 is thought to be a unique photoreceptor as it doesn't contain a prosthetic chromophore but its light-sensing ability is intrinsic to the molecule. Tryptophan (Trp) residue 285 has been suggested to act the UV-B sensor, while other Trp residues have been also seen to be involved (Trp233 > Trp337 > Trp94) although in-vivo data suggests that Trp285 and Trp233 are most important.

== Evolution ==
Although the complete genome sequence is only available from a limited number of angiosperms, bioinformatic analysis suggests that there are a large number of UVR8 orthologs. Both number and position of key residues seem to be well conserved among angiosperms but also other plant species (e.g., Chlamydomonas reinhardtii and Volvox carteri). The latter implies that UVR8 potentially appeared before the evolutionary split in vascular land plants which would be rational considering that at that time the amount of UV-B radiation that penetrated the earth surface was higher as the ozone layer was not fully developed, hence UV protection and acclimation would be of crucial importance.

== Structure ==
UVR8 is a β-propeller protein with 7 blade-shaped β-sheets. It shares sequence homology with mammalian proteins involved in regulating chromatin condensation, for example the human RCC1 gene product. In the dark state, UVR8 forms a homodimer that is localized in the cytosol, but UV-B illumination induces the dissociation of UVR8 dimer to its respective monomers and translocation to the nucleus occurs. The dimer is held together via a complex salt bridge network.

== Mechanism ==
Upon UV-B irradiation, light is absorbed by one or more Trp residues which are situated adjacent to Arg residues which form salt bridges across the dimer interface. It is thought that this light absorption induces the disruption of the salt-bridges and thus leads to the molecule's monomerization. Following monomerization, UVR8 accumulates in the nucleus where it interacts with a protein called constitutively photomorphogenic 1 (COP1). COP1 is known to act as an E3 Ubiquitin ligase that targets key transcription factors for ubiquitination and proteasome-mediated degradation. However, in the case of UVR8, it has been shown to act as a positive regulator of UVR8-mediated UV-B signalling. Upon UV-B illumination, UVR8 interacts via a C-terminal 27 amino acid region with the WD40 domain of COP1 in the nucleus, which triggers the induction of ELONGATED HYPOCOTYL 5 (HY5) — a key transcription factor for several UV-B responsive genes, and overall results in UV-B acclimation.
