= Photoreceptor protein =

Molecular photoreceptors

Photoreceptor proteins are light-sensitive proteins involved in the sensing and response to light in a variety of organisms. Some examples are rhodopsin in the photoreceptor cells of the vertebrate retina, phytochrome in plants, and bacteriorhodopsin and bacteriophytochromes in some bacteria. They mediate light responses as varied as visual perception, phototropism and phototaxis, as well as responses to light-dark cycles such as circadian rhythm and other photoperiodisms including control of flowering times in plants and mating seasons in animals.

== Structure ==
Photoreceptor proteins typically consist of a protein attached to a non-protein chromophore (sometimes referred as photopigment, even so photopigment may also refer to the photoreceptor as a whole). The chromophore reacts to light via photoisomerization or photoreduction, thus initiating a change of the receptor protein which triggers a signal transduction cascade. Chromophores found in photoreceptors include retinal (retinylidene proteins, for example rhodopsin in animals), flavin (flavoproteins, for example cryptochrome in plants and animals) and bilin (biliproteins, for example phytochrome in plants). The plant protein UVR8 is exceptional amongst photoreceptors in that it contains no external chromophore. Instead, UVR8 absorbs light through tryptophan residues within its protein coding sequence.

== Photoreceptors in animals ==
- Melanopsin: in vertebrate retina, mediates pupillary reflex, involved in regulation of circadian rhythms
- Photopsin: reception of various colors of light in the cone cells of vertebrate retina
- Rhodopsin: green-blue light reception in the rod cells of vertebrate retina
- Protein Kinase C: mediates photoreceptor deactivation, and retinal degeneration
- OPN5: sensitive to UV-light

== Photoreceptors in plants ==
- UVR8: UV-B light reception
- Cryptochrome: blue and UV-A light reception
- Phototropin: blue and UV-A light perception (to mediate phototropism and chloroplast movement)
- Zeitlupe: blue light entrainment of the circadian clock
- Phytochrome: red and far-red light reception

All the photoreceptors listed above allow plants to sense light with wavelengths range from 280 nm (UV-B) to 750 nm (far-red light). Plants use light of different wavelengths as environmental cues to both alter their position and to trigger important developmental transitions. The most prominent wavelength responsible for plant mechanisms is blue light, which can trigger cell elongation, plant orientation, and flowering. One of the most important processes regulated by photoreceptors is known as photomorphogenesis. When a seed germinates underground in the absence of light, its stem rapidly elongates upwards. When it breaks through the surface of the soil, photoreceptors perceive light. The activated photoreceptors cause a change in developmental program; the plant starts producing chlorophyll and switches to photosynthetic growth.

== Photoreceptors in phototactic flagellates ==
(Also see: Eyespot apparatus)

- Channelrhodopsin: in unicellular algae, mediates phototaxis
- Chlamyopsin and volvoxopsin
- Flavoproteins

== Photoreceptors in archaea and bacteria ==
- Bacteriophytochrome
- sensory bacteriorhodopsin
- Halorhodopsin
- Proteorhodopsin
- Cyanobacteriochrome

== Photoreception and signal transduction ==
- Visual cycle
- Visual phototransduction

== Responses to photoreception ==
- Visual perception
- Phototropism
- Phototaxis
- Circadian rhythm (body clock)
- Photoperiodism

== See also ==
- Biliproteins
- Photomolecular biology
