= Vertebrate visual opsin =

Vision proteins

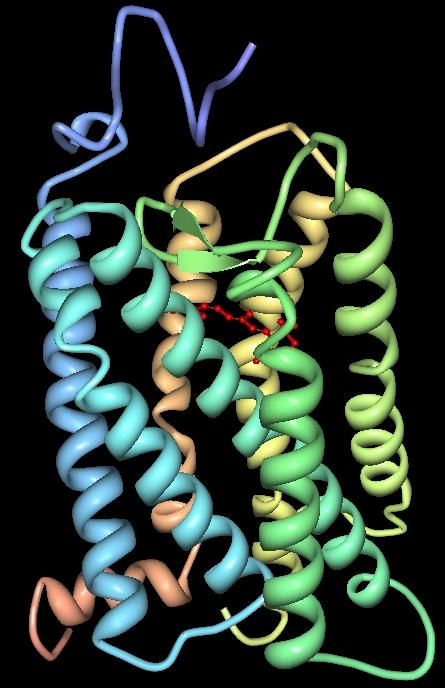
Three-dimensional structure of bovine rhodopsin. The seven transmembrane domains are shown in varying colors. The retinal chromophore is shown in red.

Vertebrate visual opsins are a subclass of ciliary opsins and mediate vision in vertebrates. They include the opsins in human rod and cone cells. They are often abbreviated to opsin, as they were the first opsins discovered and are still the most widely studied opsins.

== Opsins ==
Opsin refers strictly to the apoprotein (without bound retinal). When an opsin binds retinal to form a holoprotein, it is referred to as Retinylidene protein. However, the distinction is often ignored, and opsin may refer loosely to both (regardless of whether retinal is bound).

Opsins are G-protein-coupled receptors (GPCRs) and must bind retinal — typically 11-cis-retinal — in order to be photosensitive, since the retinal acts as the chromophore. When the Retinylidene protein absorbs a photon, the retinal isomerizes and is released by the opsin. The process that follows the isomerization and renewal of retinal is known as the visual cycle. Free 11-cis-retinal is photosensitive and carries its own spectral sensitivity of 380 nm. However, to trigger the phototransduction cascade, the process that underlies the visual signal, the retinal must be bound to an opsin when it is isomerized. The retinylidene protein has a spectral sensitivity that differs from that of free retinal and depends on the opsin sequence.

While opsins can only bind retinal, there are two forms of retinal that can act as the chromophore for vertebrate visual opsins:

- Retinal 1 (11-cis-Retinal) - the common form present in most opsins
- Retinal 2 (11-cis-3,4-Dehydroretinal) - a rarer form that is relatively red-shifted compared to retinal 1.

Animals living on land and marine fish form their visual pigments exclusively with retinal 1. However, many freshwater fish and amphibians can also form visual pigments with retinal 2, depending on the activation of the enzyme retinal-3,4-desaturase (GO:0061899). Many of these species can switch between these chromophores during their life cycle, to adapt to a changing habitat.

== Function ==
Normalised absorption spectra of the three human photopsins and of human rhodopsin (dashed). Drawn after Bowmaker and Dartnall (1980). (Absorption curves do not directly reflect sensitivity spectra.)

Isomerization of 11-cis-retinal into all-trans-retinal by light induces a conformational change in the protein that activates the phototransduction pathway.

== Subclasses ==
There are two classes of vertebrate visual opsin, differentiated by whether they are expressed in rod or cone photoreceptors.

=== Cone opsins ===
Opsins expressed in cone cells are called cone opsins. The cone opsins are called photopsins when unbound to retinal and iodopsins when bound to retinal. Cone opsins mediate photopic vision (daylight). Cone opsins are further subdivided according to the spectral sensitivity of their iodopsin, namely the wavelength at which the highest light absorption is observed (λ_{max}).

Name	Abbr.	Cell	λ_{max} (nm)	Human variant
Long-wave sensitive	LWS	Cone	500–570	OPN1LW "red" erythrolabe (564 nm); OPN1MW "green" chlorolabe (534 nm)
Rhodopsin-like 2	Rh2	Cone	480–530	(Extinct in mammals)
Short-wave sensitive 2	SWS2	Cone	400–470	(extinct in therian mammals)
Short-wave sensitive 1	SWS1	Cone	355–445	OPN1SW "blue" cyanolabe (420 nm) (extinct in monotremes)

=== Rod opsins ===
Opsins expressed in rod cells are called rod opsins. The rod opsins are called scotopsins when unbound to retinal and rhodopsins or porphyropsins when bound to retinal (1 and 2, respectively). Rod opsins mediate scotopic vision (dim light). Compared to cone opsins, the spectral sensitivity of rhodopsin is quite stable, not deviating far from 500 nm in any vertebrate.

Name	Abbr.	Cell	λ_{max} (nm)	Human variant
Scotopsin	Rh1	Rod	Rhodopsin: ~500; Porphyropsin: ~522	RHO human rhodopsin (498 nm)

== Evolution ==
- - LWS
  - - SWS1
    - - SWS2
      - - Rh2
        - - Rh1

Extant vertebrates typically have four cone opsin classes (LWS, SWS1, SWS2, and Rh2) as well as one rod opsin class (rhodopsin, Rh1), all of which were inherited from early vertebrate ancestors. These five classes of vertebrate visual opsins emerged through a series of gene duplications beginning with LWS and ending with Rh1, according to the cladogram to the right; this serves as an example of neofunctionalization. Each class has since evolved into numerous variants. Evolutionary relationships, deduced using the amino acid sequence of the opsins, are frequently used to categorize cone opsins into their respective class. Mammals lost Rh2 and SWS2 classes during the nocturnal bottleneck. Primate ancestors later developed two LWS opsins (LWS and MWS), leaving humans with 4 visual opsins in 3 classes.

== History ==
George Wald received the 1967 Nobel Prize in Physiology or Medicine for his experiments in the 1950s that showed the difference in absorbance by these photopsins (see image).

== See also ==
- Color blindness
- Melanopsin
- Retinylidene protein
- Rhodopsin
- Visual cycle
- Visual phototransduction
