= Retinal isomerase =

retinal isomerase

Identifiers
- EC no.: 5.2.1.3
- CAS no.: 9023-76-1

Databases
- IntEnz: IntEnz view
- BRENDA: BRENDA entry
- ExPASy: NiceZyme view
- KEGG: KEGG entry
- MetaCyc: metabolic pathway
- PRIAM: profile
- PDB structures: RCSB PDB PDBe PDBsum
- Gene Ontology: AmiGO / QuickGO
Search
- PMC: articles
- PubMed: articles
- NCBI: proteins

Retinal isomerase (EC 5.2.1.3) is an enzyme that catalyzes the isomerisation of all-trans-retinal in the eye into 11-cis-retinal which is the form that most opsins bind.

all-trans-retinal $\rightleftharpoons$ 11-cis-retinal

Hence, this enzyme has one substrate, all-trans-retinal, and one product, 11-cis-retinal.

This enzyme belongs to the family of isomerases, specifically cis-trans isomerases. Its systematic name is all-trans-retinal 11-cis-trans-isomerase. Other names are retinene isomerase, and retinoid isomerase. This enzyme participates in the retinol metabolism.
