= Photopigment =

Unstable pigments that undergo a chemical change when they absorb light

Photopigments are unstable pigments that undergo a chemical change when they absorb light. The term is generally applied to the non-protein chromophore moiety of photosensitive chromoproteins, such as the pigments involved in photosynthesis and photoreception. In medical terminology, "photopigment" commonly refers to the photoreceptor proteins of the retina.

== Photosynthetic pigments ==
Photosynthetic pigments convert light into biochemical energy. Examples for photosynthetic pigments are chlorophyll, carotenoids and phycobilins. These pigments enter a high-energy state upon absorbing a photon which they can release in the form of chemical energy. This can occur via light-driven pumping of ions across a biological membrane (e.g. in the case of the proton pump bacteriorhodopsin) or via excitation and transfer of electrons released by photolysis (e.g. in the photosystems of the thylakoid membranes of plant chloroplasts). In chloroplasts, the light-driven electron transfer chain in turn drives the pumping of protons across the membrane.

== Photoreceptor pigments ==
The pigments in photoreceptor proteins either change their conformation or undergo photoreduction when they absorb a photon. This change in the conformation or redox state of the chromophore then affects the protein conformation or activity and triggers a signal transduction cascade.

Examples of photoreceptor pigments include:

- retinal (in rhodopsin)
- flavin (in cryptochrome)
- bilin (in phytochrome)

== Photopigments of the vertebrate retina ==
In medical terminology, the term photopigment is applied to opsin-type photoreceptor proteins, specifically rhodopsin and photopsins, the photoreceptor proteins in the retinal rods and cones of vertebrates that are responsible for visual perception, but also melanopsin and others.

== See also ==
- Biological pigment
