= Retinal G protein coupled receptor =

Protein-coding gene in the species Homo sapiens

RGR

Identifiers
- Aliases: RGR, RP44, Retinal G protein coupled receptor
- External IDs: OMIM: 600342; MGI: 1929473; GeneCards: RGR

Gene location (Human)
Chr.	Chromosome 10 (human)
Band	10q23.1	Start	84,230,666 bp
Band	10q23.1	End	84,259,960 bp

Gene location (Mouse)
Chr.	Chromosome 14 (mouse)
Band	14|14 B	Start	36,756,866 bp
Band	14|14 B	End	36,770,921 bp
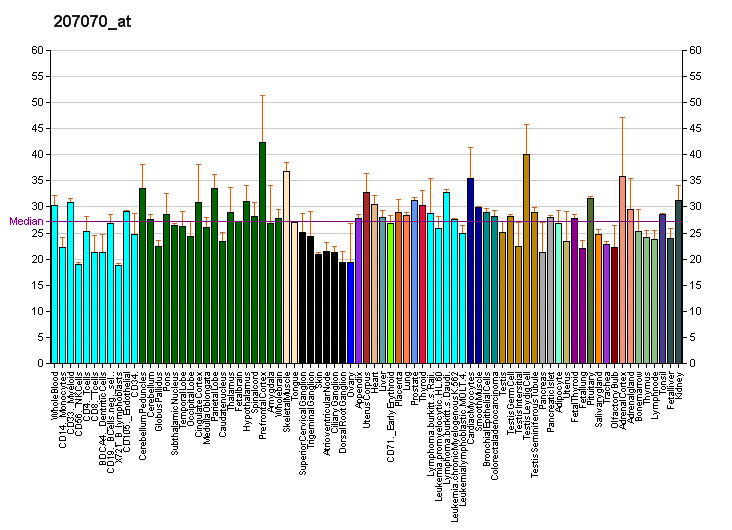
RNA expression pattern
Bgee	Human / Mouse (ortholog); Top expressed in: retinal pigment epithelium; gastric mucosa; testicle; cingulate gyrus; anterior cingulate cortex; nucleus accumbens; caudate nucleus; right frontal lobe; gonad; Brodmann area 9 / Top expressed in: retinal pigment epithelium; choroid; olfactory epithelium; ciliary body; epithelium of lens; lacrimal gland; iris; neural layer of retina; corneal stroma; lip; More reference expression data
BioGPS	More reference expression data
Gene ontology
Molecular function	G protein-coupled receptor activity; protein binding; photoreceptor activity; signal transducer activity; G protein-coupled photoreceptor activity
Cellular component	integral component of membrane; integral component of plasma membrane; membrane
Biological process	G protein-coupled receptor signaling pathway; signal transduction; visual perception; response to stimulus; phototransduction; detection of visible light; cellular response to light stimulus
Sources:Amigo / QuickGO
Orthologs
Databases	NCBI: entry; OMA: entry
Species	Human	Mouse
Entrez	5995	57811
Ensembl	ENSG00000148604	ENSMUSG00000021804
UniProt	P47804	Q9Z2B3
RefSeq (mRNA)	NM_001012720; NM_001012722; NM_002921	NM_001301692; NM_001301694; NM_021340
RefSeq (protein)	NP_001012738; NP_001012740; NP_002912	NP_001288621; NP_001288623; NP_067315
Location (UCSC)	Chr 10: 84.23 – 84.26 Mb	Chr 14: 36.76 – 36.77 Mb
PubMed search
- Wikidata
View/Edit Human	View/Edit Mouse

RPE-retinal G protein-coupled receptor also known as RGR-opsin is a protein that in humans is encoded by the RGR gene. RGR-opsin is a member of the rhodopsin-like receptor subfamily of GPCR. Like other opsins which bind retinaldehyde, it contains a conserved lysine residue in the seventh transmembrane domain. RGR-opsin comes in different isoforms produced by alternative splicing.

== Function ==
RGR-opsin preferentially binds all-trans-retinal, which is the dominant form in the dark adapted retina, upon light exposure it is isomerized to 11-cis-retinal. Therefore, RGR-opsin presumably acts as a photoisomerase to convert all-trans-retinal to 11-cis-retinal, similar to retinochrome in invertebrates. 11-cis-retinal is isomerized back within rhodopsin and the iodopsins in the rods and cones of the retina. RGR-opsin is exclusively expressed in tissue close to the rods and cones, the retinal pigment epithelium (RPE) and Müller cells.

== Phylogeny ==
The RGR-opsins are restricted to the echinoderms, the hemichordates the craniates. The craniates are the taxon that contains mammals and with them humans. The RGR-opsins are one of the seven subgroups of the chromopsins. The other groups are the peropsins, the retinochromes, the nemopsins, the astropsins, the varropsins, and the gluopsins. The chromopsins are one of three subgroups of the tetraopsins (also known as RGR/Go or Group 4 opsins). The other groups are the neuropsins and the Go-opsins. The tetraopsins are one of the five major groups of the animal opsins, also known as type 2 opsins). The other groups are the ciliary opsins (c-opsins, cilopsins), the rhabdomeric opsins (r-opsins, rhabopsins), the xenopsins, and the nessopsins. Four of these subclades occur in Bilateria (all but the nessopsins). However, the bilaterian clades constitute a paraphyletic taxon without the opsins from the cnidarians.

The phylogenetic relationship of the RGR-opsins to the other opsins
Phylogenetic reconstruction of the opsins. The outgroup contains other G protein-coupled receptors. The frame highlights the tetraopsins, which are expanded in the next image.

Phylogenetic reconstruction of the tetraopsins. The outgroup contains other G protein-coupled receptors including the other opsins. The frame highlights the chromopsins, which are expanded in the next image.

Phylogenetic reconstruction of the chromopsins. The outgroup contains other G protein-coupled receptors including the other opsins. The frame highlights the RGR-opsins.

In the phylogeny above, Each clade contains sequences from opsins and other G protein-coupled receptors. The number of sequences and two pie charts are shown next to the clade. The first pie chart shows the percentage of a certain amino acid at the position in the sequences corresponding to position 296 in cattle rhodopsin. The amino acids are color-coded. The colors are red for lysine (K), purple for glutamic acid (E), orange for arginine (R), dark and mid-gray for other amino acids, and light gray for sequences that have no data at that position. The second pie chart gives the taxon composition for each clade, green stands for craniates, dark green for cephalochordates, mid green for echinoderms, brown for nematodes, pale pink for annelids, dark blue for arthropods, light blue for mollusks, and purple for cnidarians. The branches to the clades have pie charts, which give support values for the branches. The values are from right to left SH-aLRT/aBayes/UFBoot. The branches are considered supported when SH-aLRT ≥ 80%, aBayes ≥ 0.95, and UFBoot ≥ 95%. If a support value is above its threshold the pie chart is black otherwise gray.

== Clinical significance ==
RGR-opsin may be associated with autosomal recessive and autosomal dominant retinitis pigmentosa (arRP and adRP, respectively).

== Interactions ==
RGR-opsin has been shown to interact with KIFBP.
