= OPN1MW =

Protein-coding gene in the species Homo sapiens

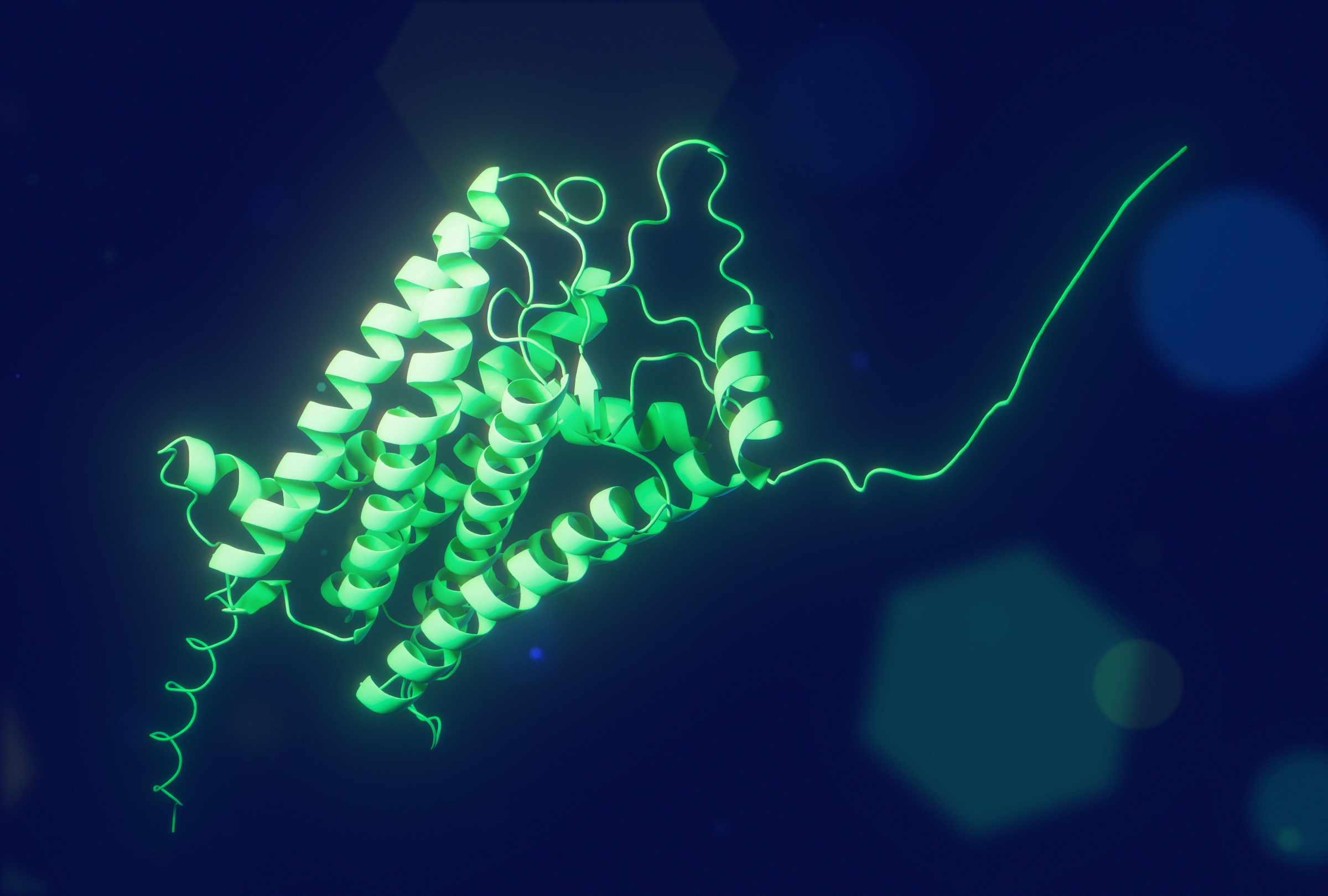

Identifiers
- Aliases: OPN1MW, CBBM, CBD, COD5, GCP, GOP, OPN1MW1, opsin 1 (cone pigments), medium-wave-sensitive, opsin 1, medium wave sensitive
- External IDs: OMIM: 300821; MGI: 1097692; GeneCards: OPN1MW

Gene location (Human)
Chr.	X chromosome (human)
Band	Xq28	Start	154,182,596 bp
Band	Xq28	End	154,196,861 bp

Gene location (Mouse)
Chr.	X chromosome (mouse)
Band	X|X A7.3	Start	73,171,070 bp
Band	X|X A7.3	End	73,194,366 bp
RNA expression pattern
Bgee	Human / Mouse (ortholog); Top expressed in: testicle; appendix; blood; urinary bladder; myometrium; left adrenal cortex; coronary artery; left coronary artery; right auricle of heart; stomach / Top expressed in: neural layer of retina; muscle of thigh; retinal pigment epithelium; epithelium of lens; embryo; outer nuclear layer; knee joint; soleus muscle; skeletal muscle tissue; quadriceps femoris muscle; More reference expression data
BioGPS	n/a
Gene ontology
Molecular function	G protein-coupled receptor activity; photoreceptor activity; signal transducer activity; G protein-coupled photoreceptor activity; identical protein binding
Cellular component	integral component of membrane; plasma membrane; membrane; photoreceptor outer segment; integral component of plasma membrane; photoreceptor disc membrane
Biological process	positive regulation of cytokinesis; signal transduction; visual perception; retinoid metabolic process; response to stimulus; G protein-coupled receptor signaling pathway; phototransduction; detection of visible light; cellular response to light stimulus
Sources:Amigo / QuickGO
Orthologs
Databases	NCBI: entry; OMA: entry
Species	Human	Mouse
Entrez	2652	14539
Ensembl	ENSG00000268221	ENSMUSG00000031394
UniProt	P04001	O35599
RefSeq (mRNA)	NM_000513	NM_008106
RefSeq (protein)	NP_001316996; NP_000504; NP_001041646	NP_032132
Location (UCSC)	Chr X: 154.18 – 154.2 Mb	Chr X: 73.17 – 73.19 Mb
PubMed search
- Wikidata
View/Edit Human	View/Edit Mouse

Green-sensitive opsin is a protein that in humans is encoded by the OPN1MW gene. The number of genes that code for green-sensitive opsin varies from person to person, but in the reference genome (GRCh38) there are three: OPN1MW, OPN1MW2 and OPN1MW3, all which code for identical proteins.

The OPN1MW gene provides instructions for making an opsin pigment that is more sensitive to light in the middle of the visible spectrum (yellow/green light).

== See also ==
- Opsin
- OPN1LW
- OPN1SW
