= OPN1SW =

Protein-coding gene in the species Homo sapiens

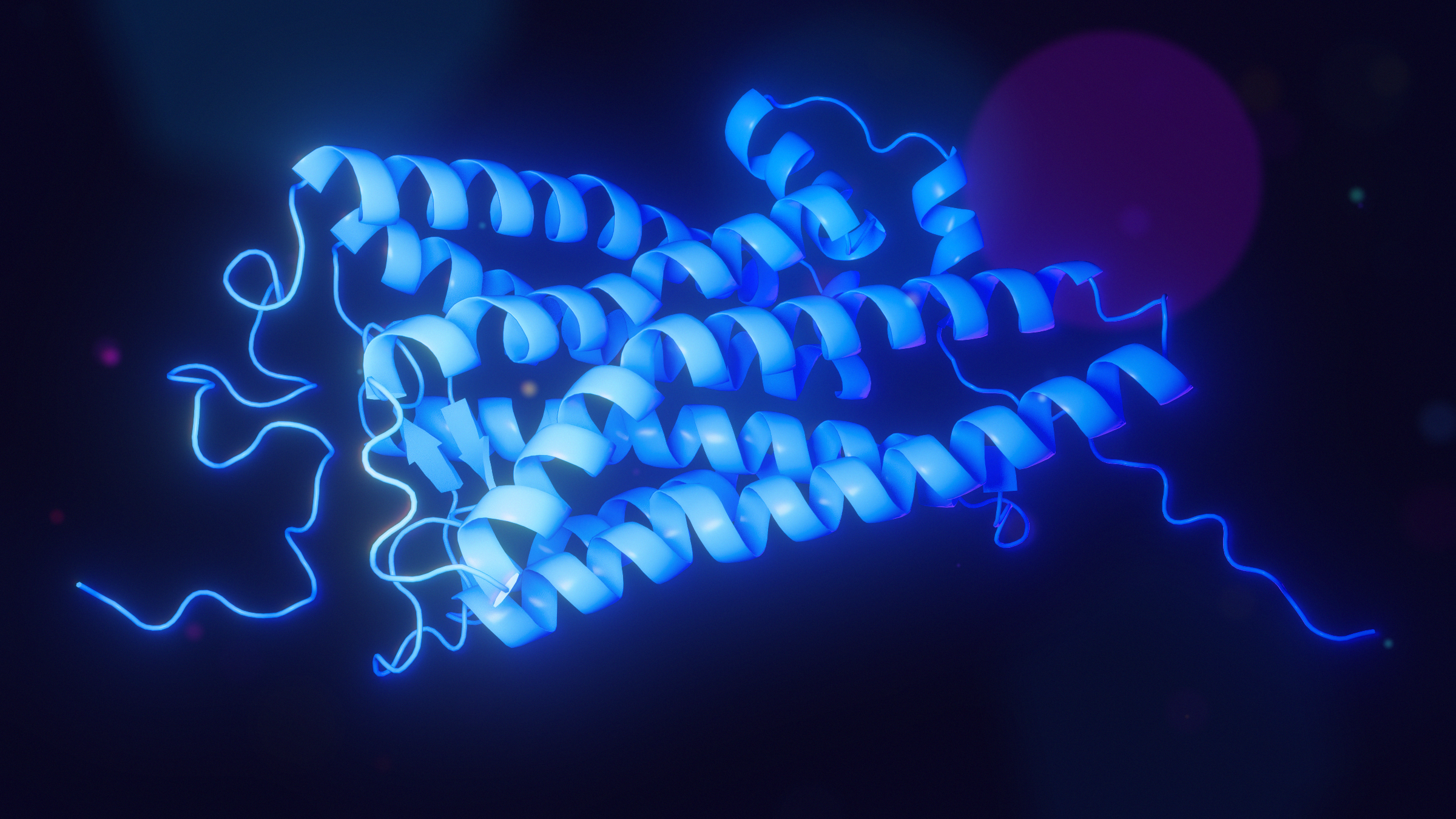

Identifiers
- Aliases: OPN1SW, BCP, BOP, CBT, opsin 1 (cone pigments), short-wave-sensitive, opsin 1, short wave sensitive
- External IDs: OMIM: 613522; MGI: 99438; GeneCards: OPN1SW
Available structures
PDB	Ortholog search: PDBe RCSB
PDB	List of PDB id codes 1KPN

Gene location (Human)
Chr.	Chromosome 7 (human)
Band	7q32.1	Start	128,772,485 bp
Band	7q32.1	End	128,775,794 bp

Gene location (Mouse)
Chr.	Chromosome 6 (mouse)
Band	6|6 A3.3	Start	29,376,670 bp
Band	6|6 A3.3	End	29,388,467 bp
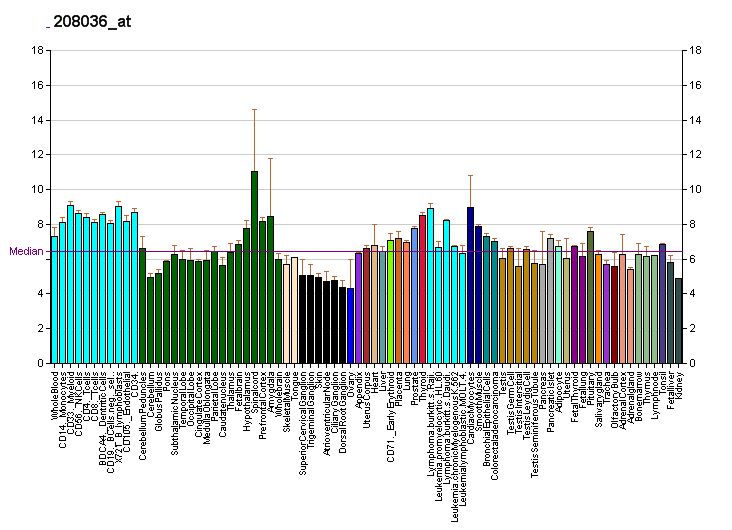
RNA expression pattern
Bgee	Human / Mouse (ortholog); Top expressed in: sural nerve; Brodmann area 46; stromal cell of endometrium; retinal pigment epithelium; Achilles tendon; Descending thoracic aorta; apex of heart; prefrontal cortex; ganglionic eminence; exocrine gland / Top expressed in: blastocyst; neural layer of retina; epithelium of lens; outer nuclear layer; retinal pigment epithelium; lumbar subsegment of spinal cord; embryo; morula; lumbar spinal ganglion; genital tubercle; More reference expression data
BioGPS	More reference expression data
Gene ontology
Molecular function	G protein-coupled receptor activity; photoreceptor activity; signal transducer activity; G protein-coupled photoreceptor activity; signaling receptor activity
Cellular component	integral component of membrane; integral component of plasma membrane; membrane; photoreceptor outer segment; photoreceptor disc membrane
Biological process	response to stimulus; signal transduction; visual perception; retinoid metabolic process; phototransduction; detection of visible light; G protein-coupled receptor signaling pathway; cellular response to light stimulus
Sources:Amigo / QuickGO
Orthologs
Databases	NCBI: entry; OMA: entry
Species	Human	Mouse
Entrez	611	12057
Ensembl	ENSG00000128617	ENSMUSG00000058831
UniProt	P03999	P51491
RefSeq (mRNA)	NM_001708; NM_001385125	NM_007538
RefSeq (protein)	NP_001699	NP_031564
Location (UCSC)	Chr 7: 128.77 – 128.78 Mb	Chr 6: 29.38 – 29.39 Mb
PubMed search
- Wikidata
View/Edit Human	View/Edit Mouse

Blue-sensitive opsin is a protein that in humans is encoded by the OPN1SW gene. The OPN1SW gene provides instructions for making a protein that is essential for normal color vision. This protein is found in the retina, which is the light-sensitive tissue at the back of the eye.

The OPN1SW gene provides instructions for making an opsin pigment that is more sensitive to light in the blue/violet part of the visible spectrum (short-wavelength light). Cones with this pigment are called short-wavelength-sensitive or S cones. In response to light, the photopigment triggers a series of chemical reactions within an S cone. These reactions ultimately alter the cell's electrical charge, generating a signal that is transmitted to the brain. The brain combines input from all three types of cones to produce normal color vision.

== See also ==
- Opsin
- OPN1LW
- OPN1MW
