= RRH =

Protein-coding gene in the species Homo sapiens

Identifiers
- Aliases: RRH, retinal pigment epithelium-derived rhodopsin homolog
- External IDs: OMIM: 605224; MGI: 1097709; GeneCards: RRH

Gene location (Human)
Chr.	Chromosome 4 (human)
Band	4q25	Start	109,827,972 bp
Band	4q25	End	109,849,123 bp

Gene location (Mouse)
Chr.	Chromosome 3 (mouse)
Band	3 G3|3 59.09 cM	Start	129,598,057 bp
Band	3 G3|3 59.09 cM	End	129,616,236 bp
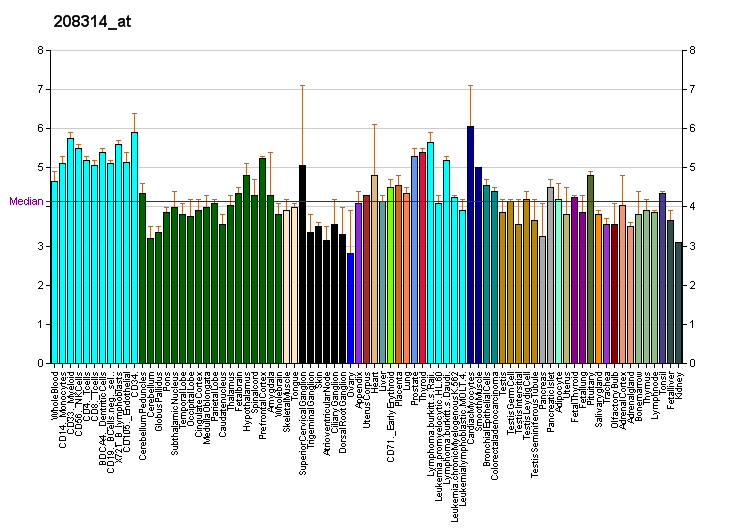
RNA expression pattern
Bgee	Human / Mouse (ortholog); Top expressed in: testicle; retinal pigment epithelium; cerebellar cortex; cerebellar hemisphere; right hemisphere of cerebellum; prefrontal cortex; Achilles tendon; stromal cell of endometrium; Brodmann area 9; developmental structure / Top expressed in: retinal pigment epithelium; neural layer of retina; zygote; secondary oocyte; primary oocyte; morula; lens; ciliary body; embryo; Epithelium of choroid plexus; More reference expression data
BioGPS	More reference expression data
Gene ontology
Molecular function	photoreceptor activity; signal transducer activity; G protein-coupled receptor activity; G protein-coupled photoreceptor activity
Cellular component	integral component of membrane; integral component of plasma membrane; membrane; photoreceptor outer segment
Biological process	signal transduction; response to stimulus; visual perception; G protein-coupled receptor signaling pathway; phototransduction; detection of visible light; cellular response to light stimulus
Sources:Amigo / QuickGO
Orthologs
Databases	NCBI: entry; OMA: entry
Species	Human	Mouse
Entrez	10692	20132
Ensembl	ENSG00000180245	ENSMUSG00000028012
UniProt	O14718	O35214
RefSeq (mRNA)	NM_006583	NM_009102
RefSeq (protein)	NP_006574	NP_033128
Location (UCSC)	Chr 4: 109.83 – 109.85 Mb	Chr 3: 129.6 – 129.62 Mb
PubMed search
- Wikidata
View/Edit Human	View/Edit Mouse

Peropsin, a visual pigment-like receptor, is a protein that in humans is encoded by the RRH gene. It belongs like other animal opsins to the G protein-coupled receptors. Even so, the first peropsins were already discovered in mice and humans in 1997, not much is known about them.

== Photochemistry ==
Like most opsins, peropsins have in its seventh transmembrane domain a lysine corresponding to amino acid position 296 in cattle rhodopsin, which is important for retinal binding and light sensing.

In amphioxus, a cephalochordate, a peropsin binds in the dark-state all-trans-retinal instead of 11-cis-retinal, as it is in cattle rhodopsin. Therefore, peropsins have been suggested to be photoisomerases.

== Tissue localization ==
In mice, a peropsin is localized to the apical microvilli of the retinal pigment epithelium (RPE). There, it regulates storage or the movement of vitamin A from the retina to the RPE. A peropsin is also expressed in keratinocytes of the human skin. In keratinocyte cell culture, it reacts to UV light if retinal is supplied. In chicken, a peropsin is expressed with an RGR-opsin in the pineal gland and the retina.

== Gene localization and structure ==
The human peropsin gene lies on chromosome 4 band 4q25 and has six introns like RGR-opsins. However only two of these introns are inserted at the same place, which still indicates that peropsins and RGR-opsins are more closely related to each other than to the ciliary and rhabdomeric opsins. This shared gene structure is also reflected in opsin phylogenies, where peropsins and RGR-opsins are in the same group: The chromopsins.

== Phylogeny ==
The peropsins are restricted to the craniates and the cephalochordates. The craniates are the taxon that contains mammals and with them humans. The peropsins are one of the seven subgroups of the chromopsins. The other groups are the RGR-opsins, the retinochromes, the nemopsins, the astropsins, the varropsins, and the gluopsins. The chromopsins are one of three subgroups of the tetraopsins (also known as RGR/Go or Group 4 opsins). The other groups are the neuropsins and the Go-opsins. The tetraopsins are one of the five major groups of the animal opsins, also known as type 2 opsins). The other groups are the ciliary opsins (c-opsins, cilopsins), the rhabdomeric opsins (r-opsins, rhabopsins), the xenopsins, and the nessopsins. Four of these subclades occur in Bilateria (all but the nessopsins). However, the bilaterian clades constitute a paraphyletic taxon without the opsins from the cnidarians.

The phylogenetic relationship of the peropsins to the other opsins
Phylogenetic reconstruction of the opsins. The outgroup contains other G protein-coupled receptors. The frame highlights the tetraopsins, which are expanded in the next image.

Phylogenetic reconstruction of the tetraopsins. The outgroup contains other G protein-coupled receptors including the other opsins. The frame highlights the chromopsins, which are expanded in the next image.

Phylogenetic reconstruction of the chromopsins. The outgroup contains other G protein-coupled receptors including the other opsins. The frame highlights the peropsins.

In the phylogeny above, Each clade contains sequences from opsins and other G protein-coupled receptors. The number of sequences and two pie charts are shown next to the clade. The first pie chart shows the percentage of a certain amino acid at the position in the sequences corresponding to position 296 in cattle rhodopsin. The amino acids are color-coded. The colors are red for lysine (K), purple for glutamic acid (E), orange for arginine (R), dark and mid-gray for other amino acids, and light gray for sequences that have no data at that position. The second pie chart gives the taxon composition for each clade, green stands for craniates, dark green for cephalochordates, mid green for echinoderms, brown for nematodes, pale pink for annelids, dark blue for arthropods, light blue for mollusks, and purple for cnidarians. The branches to the clades have pie charts, which give support values for the branches. The values are from right to left SH-aLRT/aBayes/UFBoot. The branches are considered supported when SH-aLRT ≥ 80%, aBayes ≥ 0.95, and UFBoot ≥ 95%. If a support value is above its threshold the pie chart is black otherwise gray.

== Clinical significance ==
Since RGR-opsin may be associated with retinitis pigmentosa, which is like peropsin also expressed in the retinal pigment epithelium, peropsin was screened for a link with retinitis pigmentosa. However, no link could be established.
