= OPN1LW =

Protein-coding gene in humans

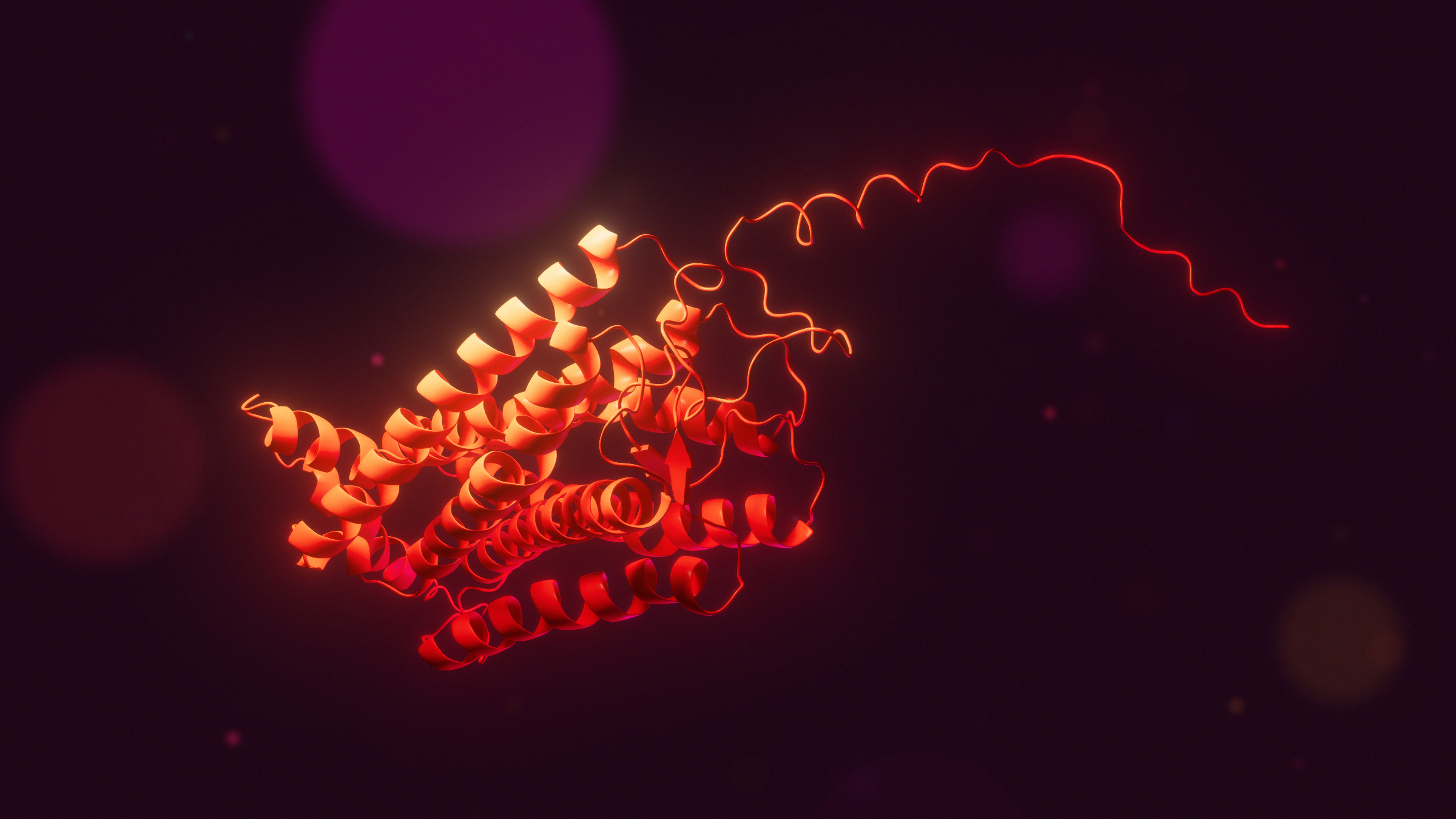

Identifiers
- Aliases: OPN1LW, CBBM, CBP, COD5, RCP, ROP, opsin 1 (cone pigments), long-wave-sensitive, opsin 1, long wave sensitive
- External IDs: OMIM: 300822; MGI: 1097692; GeneCards: OPN1LW
Available structures
PDB	Ortholog search: PDBe RCSB
PDB	List of PDB id codes 8IU2

Gene location (Human)
Chr.	X chromosome (human)
Band	Xq28	Start	154,144,243 bp
Band	Xq28	End	154,159,032 bp

Gene location (Mouse)
Chr.	X chromosome (mouse)
Band	X|X A7.3	Start	73,171,070 bp
Band	X|X A7.3	End	73,194,366 bp
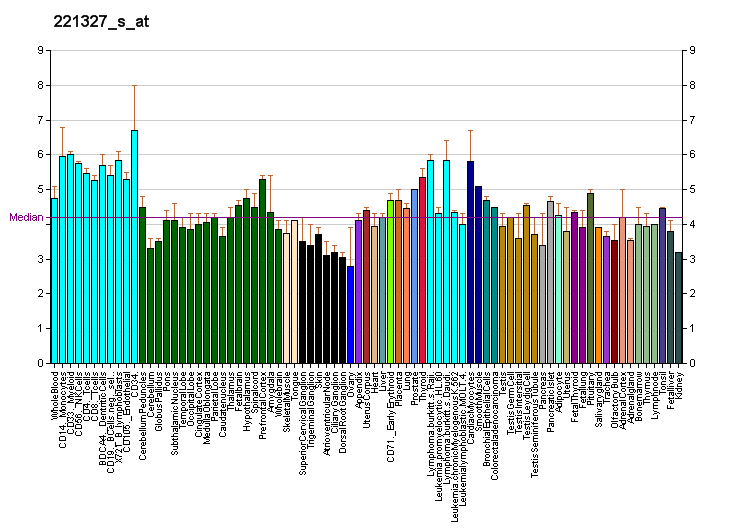
RNA expression pattern
Bgee	Human / Mouse (ortholog); Top expressed in: ganglionic eminence; blood; left uterine tube; skin of leg; left adrenal cortex; lobe of thyroid gland; left lobe of thyroid gland; ascending aorta; right ovary; prostate / Top expressed in: neural layer of retina; muscle of thigh; retinal pigment epithelium; epithelium of lens; embryo; outer nuclear layer; knee joint; soleus muscle; skeletal muscle tissue; quadriceps femoris muscle; More reference expression data
BioGPS	More reference expression data
Gene ontology
Molecular function	G protein-coupled receptor activity; photoreceptor activity; signal transducer activity; G protein-coupled photoreceptor activity
Cellular component	integral component of membrane; integral component of plasma membrane; membrane; photoreceptor outer segment; photoreceptor disc membrane
Biological process	positive regulation of cytokinesis; signal transduction; visual perception; retinoid metabolic process; response to stimulus; phototransduction; detection of visible light; G protein-coupled receptor signaling pathway; cellular response to light stimulus
Sources:Amigo / QuickGO
Orthologs
Databases	NCBI: entry; OMA: entry
Species	Human	Mouse
Entrez	5956	14539
Ensembl	ENSG00000102076	ENSMUSG00000031394
UniProt	P04000	O35599
RefSeq (mRNA)	NM_020061	NM_008106
RefSeq (protein)	NP_064445	NP_032132
Location (UCSC)	Chr X: 154.14 – 154.16 Mb	Chr X: 73.17 – 73.19 Mb
PubMed search
- Wikidata
View/Edit Human	View/Edit Mouse

OPN1LW is a gene on the X chromosome that encodes for long wave sensitive (LWS) opsin, or red cone photopigment. The OPN1LW gene provides instructions for making an opsin pigment that is more sensitive to light in the yellow/orange part of the visible spectrum (long-wavelength light). The gene contains 6 exons with variability that induces shifts in the spectral range. OPN1LW is subject to homologous recombination with OPN1MW, as the two have very similar sequences. These recombinations can lead to various vision problems, such as red-green colourblindness and blue monochromacy. The protein encoded is a G-protein coupled receptor with embedded 11-cis-retinal, whose light excitation causes a cis-trans conformational change that begins the process of chemical signalling to the brain.

It is responsible for perception of visible light in the yellow-green range on the visible spectrum (around 500-570nm).

== Gene ==
OPN1LW produces red-sensitive opsin, while its counterparts, OPN1MW and OPN1SW, produce green-sensitive and blue-sensitive opsin respectively. OPN1LW and OPN1MW are on the X chromosome at position Xq28. They are in a tandem array, composed of a single OPN1LW gene which is followed by one or more OPN1MW genes. The locus control region (LCR; OPSIN-LCR) regulates expression of both genes, with only the OPN1LW gene and nearby adjacent OPN1MW genes being expressed and contributing to the colour vision phenotype. The LCR can not reach further than the first or second OPN1MW genes in the array. The slight difference in OPN1LW and OPN1MW absorption spectra is due to a handful of amino acid differences between the two highly similar genes.

=== Exons ===
OPN1LW and OPN1MW both have six exons. Amino acid dimorphisms on exon 5 at positions 277 and 285 are the most influential on the spectral differences observed between LWS and MWS pigments. There are 3 amino acid changes on exon 5 for OPN1LW and OPN1MW that contribute to the spectral shift seen between their respective opsin: OPN1MW has phenylalanine at positions 277 and 309, and alanine at 285; OPN1LW have tyrosine at position 277 and 309, and threonine at position 285. The identity of the amino acids at these positions in exon 5 is what determines the gene as being M class or L class. On exon 3 at position 180 both genes can contain serine or alanine, but the presence of serine produces longer wavelength sensitivity, a consideration in the making of color-matching functions. Exon 4 has two spectral tuning positions: 230 for isoleucine (longer peak wavelength) or threonine, and 233 for alanine (longer peak wavelength) or serine.

=== Homologous recombination ===
The arrangement of OPN1LW and OPN1MW, as well as the high similarity of the two genes, allows for frequent recombination between the two. Unequal recombination between female X chromosomes during meiosis is the main cause of the varying number of OPN1LW genes and OPN1MW genes among individuals, as well as being the cause of inherited colour vision deficiencies. Recombination events usually begin with misalignment of an OPN1LW gene with an OPN1MW gene and are followed by a certain type of crossover, which can result in many different gene abnormalities. Crossover in regions between OPN1LW and OPN1MW genes can produce chromosome products with extra OPN1LW or OPN1MW genes on one chromosome and reduced OPN1LW or OPN1MW genes on the other chromosome. If crossover occurs within the misaligned genes of OPN1LW and OPN1MW, then a new array will be produced on each chromosome consisting of only partial pieces of the two genes. This would create colour vision deficiencies if either chromosome were passed onto a male offspring.

== Protein ==
The LWS type I opsin is a G-protein coupled receptor (GPCR) protein with embedded 11-cis retinal. It is a transmembrane protein that has seven membrane domains, with the N-terminal being extracellular and the C-terminal being cytoplasmic. The LWS pigment has a maximum absorption of about 564nm, with an absorption range of around 500-570 nm. This opsin is known as the red opsin because it is the most sensitive to red light out of the three cone opsin types, not because its peak sensitivity is for red light. The peak absorption of 564nm actually falls in the yellow-green section of the visible light spectrum. When the protein comes in contact with light at a wavelength within its spectral range, the 11-cis-retinal chromophore becomes excited. The amount of energy in the light breaks the pi bond that holds the chromophore in its cis configuration, which causes photoisomerization and a shift to the trans configuration. This shift is what begins the chemical reaction sequence responsible for getting the LWS cone signal to the brain.

== Function ==
LWS opsin resides in disks of the outer segment of LWS cone cells, which mediate photopic vision along with MWS and SWS cones. Cone representation in the retina is substantially smaller than rod representation, with the majority of cones localizing in the fovea. When light within the LWS opsin spectral range reaches the retina, the 11-cis-retinal chromophore within the opsin protein becomes excited. This excitation causes a conformational change in the protein and triggers a series of chemical reactions. This reaction series passes from the LWS cone cells into horizontal cells, bipolar cells, amacrine cells, and finally ganglion cells before continuing to the brain via the optic nerve. Ganglion cells compile the signal from the LWS cones with all other cone signals that occurred in response to the light that was seen, and pass the overall signal into the optic nerve. The cones themselves do not process colour, it is the brain that decides what colour is being seen by the signal combination it receives from the ganglion cells.

== Evolutionary history ==
Before humans evolved to be a trichromatic species, our vision was dichromatic and consisted of only the OPN1LW and OPN1SW genes. OPN1LW is thought to have undergone a duplication event that lead to an extra copy of the gene, which then evolved independently to become OPN1MW. OPN1LW and OPN1MW share almost all of their DNA sequences, whereas OPN1LW and OPN1SW share less than half, suggesting that the long wave and medium wave genes diverged from each other much more recently than with OPN1SW. The emergence of OPN1MW is directly associated with dichromacy evolving to trichromacy. The presence of both LSW and MSW opsins improves colour recognition time, memorization for coloured objects, and distance-dependent discrimination, giving trichromatic organisms an evolutionary advantage over dichromatic organisms when searching for nutrient-rich food sources. Cone pigments are the product of ancestral visual pigments, which consisted of only cone cells and no rod cells. These ancestral cones evolved to become the cone cells we know today (LWS, MWS, SWS), as well as rod cells.

== Vision impairments ==
=== Red-green colour blindness ===
Many genetic changes of the OPN1LW and/or OPN1MW genes can cause red-green colourblindness. The majority of these genetic changes involve recombination events between the highly similar genes of OPN1LW and OPN1MW, which can result in deletion of one or both of these genes. Recombination can also result in the creation of many different OPN1LW and OPN1MW chimeras, which are genes that are similar to the original, but have different spectral properties. Single base-pair changes in OPN1LW can also inflict red-green colourblindness, but this is uncommon. The severity of vision loss in a red-green colourblind individual is influenced by the Ser180Ala polymorphism.

==== Protanopia ====
Protanopia is caused by defective or total loss of the OPN1LW gene function, causing vision that is entirely dependent on OPN1MW and OPN1SW. Affected individuals have dichromatic vision, with the inability to fully differentiate between green, yellow, and red colour.

==== Protanomaly ====
Protanomaly occurs when a partially functional hybrid OPN1LW gene replaces the normal gene. Opsins made from these hybrid genes have abnormal spectral shifts that impair colour perception for colours in the OPN1LW spectrum. Protanomaly is one form of anomalous trichromacy.

=== Blue cone monochromacy ===
Blue cone monochromacy is caused by a loss of function of both OPN1LW and OPN1MW. This is commonly caused by mutations in the LCR, which would result in no expression of OPN1LW or OPN1MW. With this visual impairment, the individual can only see colours in the spectrum for SWS opsins, which fall in the blue range of light.
