= Spectral sensitivity =

Relative efficiency of detecting a signal as a function of its frequency or wavelength

Spectral sensitivities (normalized responsivity spectra) of human cone cells, S, M, and L types

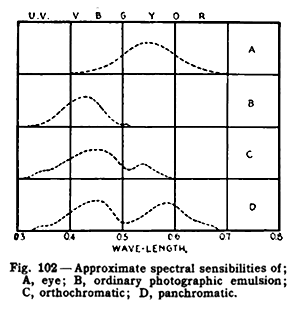
1916 plot of "spectral sensibilities." The author also uses the more modern term "spectral sensitivity" in the same book.

Spectral sensitivity is the relative efficiency of detection, of light or other signal, as a function of the frequency or wavelength of the signal.

In visual neuroscience, spectral sensitivity is used to describe the different characteristics of the photopigments in the rod cells and cone cells in the retina of the eye. It is known that the rod cells are more suited to scotopic vision and cone cells to photopic vision, and that they differ in their sensitivity to different wavelengths of light. It has been established that the maximum spectral sensitivity of the human eye under daylight conditions is at a wavelength of 555 nm, while at night the peak shifts to 507 nm.

In photography, film and sensors are often described in terms of their spectral sensitivity, to supplement their characteristic curves that describe their responsivity. A database of camera spectral sensitivity is created and its space analyzed. For X-ray films, the spectral sensitivity is chosen to be appropriate to the phosphors that respond to X-rays, rather than being related to human vision.

In sensor systems, where the output is easily quantified, the responsivity can be extended to be wavelength dependent, incorporating the spectral sensitivity. When the sensor system is linear, its spectral sensitivity and spectral responsivity can both be decomposed with similar basis functions. When a system's responsivity is a fixed monotonic nonlinear function, that nonlinearity can be estimated and corrected for, to determine the spectral sensitivity from spectral input–output data via standard linear methods.

The responses of the rod and cone cells of the retina, however, have a very context-dependent (coupled) nonlinear response, which complicates the analysis of their spectral sensitivities from experimental data. In spite of these complexities, however, the conversion of light energy spectra to the effective stimulus, the excitation of the photopigment, is quite linear, and linear characterizations such as spectral sensitivity are therefore quite useful in describing many properties of color vision.

Spectral sensitivity is sometimes expressed as a quantum efficiency, that is, as probability of getting a quantum reaction, such as a captured electron, to a quantum of light, as a function of wavelength. In other contexts, the spectral sensitivity is expressed as the relative response per light energy, rather than per quantum, normalized to a peak value of 1, and a quantum efficiency is used to calibrate the sensitivity at that peak wavelength. In some linear applications, the spectral sensitivity may be expressed as a spectral responsivity, with units such as amperes per watt.

== See also ==
- Frequency response
- Luminous efficiency function
- Orthochromasia
