= Outer plexiform layer =

Part of the retina of the eye

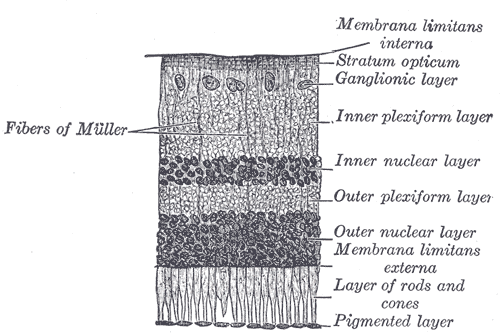
- Section of retina. (Outer plexiform layer labeled at right, sixth from the top.)

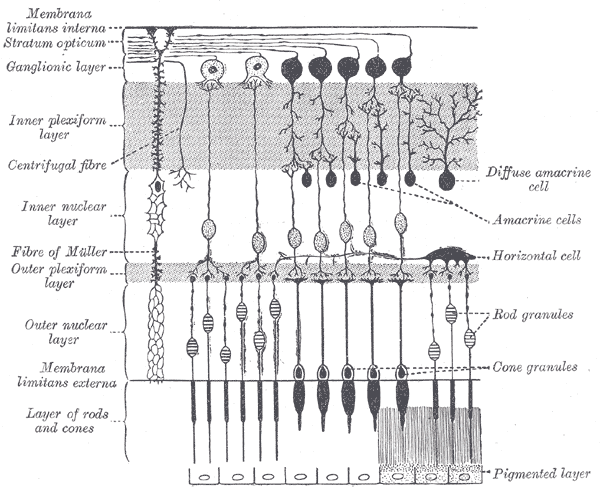
- Plan of retinal neurons. (Outer plexiform layer labeled at left, fourth from the bottom.)

Details

Identifiers
- Latin: Stratum plexiforme externum retinae
- TA98: A15.2.04.013
- FMA: 58685

The outer plexiform layer (external plexiform layer) is a layer of neuronal synapses in the retina of the eye. It consists of a dense network of synapses between dendrites of horizontal cells from the inner nuclear layer, and photoreceptor cell inner segments from the outer nuclear layer. It is much thinner than the inner plexiform layer, where amacrine cells synapse with retinal ganglion cells.

The synapses in the outer plexiform layer are between the rod cell endings or cone cell branched foot plates and horizontal cells. Unlike in most systems, rod and cone cells release neurotransmitters when not receiving a light signal.
