= Gene therapy of the human retina =

Treatment for blindness

Retinal gene therapy holds a promise in treating different forms of non-inherited and inherited blindness.

In 2008, three independent research groups reported that patients with the rare genetic retinal disease Leber's congenital amaurosis had been successfully treated using gene therapy with adeno-associated virus (AAV). In all three studies, an AAV vector was used to deliver a functional copy of the RPE65 gene, which restored vision in children with LCA. These results were widely seen as a success in the gene therapy field, and have generated excitement and momentum for AAV-mediated applications in retinal disease.

In retinal gene therapy, the most widely used vectors for ocular gene delivery are based on adeno-associated virus. The great advantage in using adeno-associated virus for the gene therapy is that it poses minimal immune responses and mediates long-term transgene expression in a variety of retinal cell types. For example, tight junctions that form the blood-retina barrier, separate subretinal space from the blood supply, providing protection from microbes and decreasing most immune-mediated damages.

There is still a lot of knowledge missing in regards of retina dystrophies. Detailed characterization is needed in order to improve knowledge. To address this issue, registries are being developed to classify and characterize rare diseases. Registries help to localize, and measure all the phenotypes of these conditions and therefore to provide easy follow-ups and provide a source of information to scientists. Registry designs vary from region to region, however localization and characterization of the phenotype are the gold standard. Examples of registries are: RetMxMap<ARVO 2009>. A Mexican and Latin-American registry created since 2009 by Dr Adda Lízbeth Villanueva Avilés is a work in progress to map inherited retina dystrophies in Mexico and other Latin countries.

== Clinical trials ==
=== Leber's congenital amaurosis ===
Preclinical studies in mouse models of Leber's congenital amaurosis (LCA) were published in 1996 and a study in dogs published in 2001. In 2008, three groups reported results of clinical trials using adeno-associated virus for LCA. In these studies, an AAV vector encoding the RPE65 gene was delivered via a "subretinal injection", where a small amount of fluid is injected underneath the retina in a short surgical procedure. Development continued, and in December 2017 the FDA approved Voretigene neparvovec (Luxturna), an adeno-associated virus vector-based gene therapy for children and adults with biallelic RPE65 gene mutations responsible for retinal dystrophy, including Leber congenital amaurosis. People must have viable retinal cells as a prerequisite for the intraocular administration of the drug.

=== Age-related macular degeneration ===
Following the successful clinical trials in LCA, researchers have been developing similar treatments using adeno-associated virus for age-related macular degeneration (AMD). To date, efforts have focused on long-term delivery of VEGF inhibitors to treat the wet form of macular degeneration. Whereas wet AMD is treated using frequent injections of recombinant protein into the eyeball, the goal of these treatments is long-term disease management following a single administration. One such study is being conducted at the Lions Eye Institute in Australia in collaboration with Avalanche Biotechnologies, a US-based biotechnology start-up. Another early-stage study is sponsored by Genzyme Corporation.

==== Ixo-vec for Wet AMD ====
Ixoberogene soroparvovec (Ixo-vec) is an investigational intravitreal gene therapy treatment targeting wet age-related macular degeneration (AMD) that aims to reduce the treatment burden by decreasing the frequency of anti-VEGF injections. Delivered as a single intravitreal injection, Ixo-vec enables sustained release of aflibercept, an anti-VEGF protein that helps control abnormal blood vessel growth and fluid leakage, which are key in AMD progression. Results from the OPTIC and LUNA trials demonstrate Ixo-vec's effectiveness in significantly reducing the need for regular injections over extended periods. Patients in these trials experienced a reduction in injection frequency by as much as 90%, with many remaining injection-free for extended periods. Visual acuity remained stable, and anatomical outcomes, like reductions in central subfield thickness (CST), were achieved. Mild intraocular inflammation was the most common side effect, with steroid prophylaxis proving effective in managing this issue. This treatment approach, if proven in further studies, could offer AMD patients a more convenient, long-lasting alternative to frequent anti-VEGF injections, enhancing quality of life and treatment adherence.

=== Choroideremia ===
In October 2011, the first clinical trial was announced for the treatment of choroideremia. Dr. Robert MacLaren of the University of Oxford, who lead the trial, co-developed the treatment with Dr. Miguel Seabra of the Imperial College, London. This Phase 1/2 trial used subretinal AAV to restore the REP gene in affected patients. Initial results of the trial were reported in January 2014 as promising as all six patients had better vision.

=== Color blindness ===
Research has shown that AAV can successfully restore color vision to treat color blindness in adult monkeys. Although this treatment has not yet entered clinical trials for humans, this work was considered a breakthrough for the ability to target cone photoreceptors.

=== Macular telangiectasia type 2 ===
Revakinagene taroretcel was approved for medical use in the United States in March 2025 for the treatment of macular telangiectasia type 2.

== Mechanism ==
=== Physiological components in retinal gene therapy ===
The vertebrate neural retina composed of several layers and distinct cell types (see anatomy of the human retina). A number of these cell types are implicated in retinal diseases, including retinal ganglion cells, which degenerate in glaucoma, the rod and cone photoreceptors, which are responsive to light and degenerate in retinitis pigmentosa, macular degeneration, and other retinal diseases, and the retinal pigment epithelium (RPE), which supports the photoreceptors and is also implicated in retinitis pigmentosa and macular degeneration.

In retinal gene therapy, AAV is capable of "transducing" these various cell types by entering the cells and expressing the therapeutic DNA sequence. Since the cells of the retina are non-dividing, AAV continues to persist and provide expression of the therapeutic DNA sequence over a long time period that can last several years.

=== AAV tropism and routes of administration ===
AAV is capable of transducing multiple cell types within the retina. AAV serotype 2, the most well-studied type of AAV, is commonly administered in one of two routes: intravitreal or subretinal. Using the intravitreal route, AAV is injected in the vitreous humor of the eye. Using the subretinal route, AAV is injected underneath the retina, taking advantage of the potential space between the photoreceptors and RPE layer, in a short surgical procedure. Although this is more invasive than the intravitreal route, the fluid is absorbed by the RPE and the retina flattens in less than 14 hours without complications. Intravitreal AAV targets retinal ganglion cells and a few Muller glial cells. Subretinal AAV efficiently targets photoreceptors and RPE cells.

The reason that different routes of administration lead to different cell types being transfected (e.g., different tropism) is that the inner limiting membrane (ILM) and the various retinal layers act as physical barriers for the delivery of drugs and vectors to the deeper retinal layers. Thus overall, subretinal AAV is 5-10 times more efficient than delivery using the intravitreal route.

=== Tropism modification and novel AAV vectors ===
One important factor in gene delivery is developing altered cell tropisms to narrow or broaden rAAV-mediated gene delivery and to increase its efficiency in tissues. Specific properties like capsid conformation, cell targeting strategies can determine which cell types are affected and also the efficiency of the gene transfer process. Different kinds of modification can be undertaken. For example, modification by chemical, immunological or genetic changes that enables the AAV2 capsid to interact with specific cell surface molecules.

Initial studies with AAV in the retina have utilized AAV serotype 2. Researchers are now beginning to develop new variants of AAV, based on naturally occurring AAV serotypes and engineered AAV variants.

Several naturally occurring serotypes of AAV have been isolated that can transduce retinal cells. Following intravitreal injection, only AAV serotypes 2 and 8 were capable of transducing retinal ganglion cells. Occasional Muller cells were transduced by AAV serotypes 2, 8, and 9. Following subretinal injection, serotypes 2, 5, 7, and 8 efficiently transduced photoreceptors, and serotypes 1, 2, 5, 7, 8, and 9 efficiently transduce RPE cells.

One example of an engineered variant has been described that efficiently transduces Muller glia following intravitreal injection, and has been used to rescue an animal model of aggressive, autosomal-dominant retinitis pigmentosa.

=== AAV and immune privilege in the retina ===
Importantly, the retina is immune-privileged, and thus does not experience a significant inflammation or immune-response when AAV is injected. Immune response to gene therapy vectors is what has caused previous attempts at gene therapy to fail, and is considered a key advantage of gene therapy in the eye. Re-administration has been successful in large animals, indicating that no long-lasting immune response is mounted.

Data indicate that the subretinal route may be subject to a greater degree of immune privilege compared to the intravitreal route.

=== Promoter sequence ===
Expression in various retinal cell types can be determined by the promoter sequence. In order to restrict expression to a specific cell type, a tissue-specific or cell-type specific promoter can be used.

For example, in rats the murine rhodopsin gene drive the expression in AAV2, GFP reporter product was found only in rat photoreceptors, not in any other retinal cell type or in the adjacent RPE after subretinal injection. On the other hand, if ubiquitously expressed immediate-early cytomegalovirus (CMV) enhancer-promoter is expressed in a wide variety of transfected cell types. Other ubiquitous promoters such as the CBA promoter, a fusion of the chicken-actin promoter and CMV immediate-early enhancer, allows stable GFP reporter expression in both RPE and photoreceptor cells after subretinal injections.

=== Modulation of expression ===
Sometimes modulation of transgene expression may be necessary since strong constitutive expression of a therapeutic gene in retinal tissues could be deleterious for long-term retinal function. Different methods have been utilized for the expression modulation. One way is using exogenously regulatable promoter system in AAV vectors. For example, the tetracycline-inducible expression system uses a silencer/transactivator AAV2 vector and a separate inducible doxycycline-responsive coinjection. When induction occurs by oral doxycycline, this system shows tight regulation of gene expression in both photoreceptor and RPE cells.

=== Examples and animal models ===
==== Targeting RPE ====
One study that was done by Royal College of Surgeons (RCS) in rat model shows that a recessive mutation in a receptor tyrosine kinase gene, mertk results in a premature stop codon and impaired phagocytosis function by RPE cells. This mutation causes the accumulation of outer segment debris in the subretinal space, which causes photoreceptor cell death. The model organism with this disease received a subretinal injection of AAV serotype 2 carrying a mouse Mertk cDNA under the control of either the CMV or RPE65 promoters. This treatment was found to prolong photoreceptor cell survival for several months and also the number of photoreceptor was 2.5 fold higher in AAV-Mertk- treated eyes compared with controls 9 weeks after injection, also they found decreased amount of debris in the subretinal space.

The protein RPE65 is used in the retinoid cycle where the all-trans-retinol within the rod outer segment is isomerized to its 11-cis form and oxidized to 11-cis retinal before it goes back to the photoreceptor and joins with opsin molecule to form functional rhodopsin. In animal knockout model (RPE65-/-), gene transfer experiment shows that early intraocular delivery of human RPE65 vector on embryonic day 14 shows efficient transduction of retinal pigment epithelium in the RPE65-/- knockout mice and rescues visual functions. This shows successful gene therapy can be attributed to early intraocular deliver to the diseased animal.

==== Targeting of photoreceptors ====
Juvenile retinoschisis is a disease that affects the nerve tissue in the eye. This disease is an X-linked recessive degenerative disease of the central macula region, and it is caused by mutation in the RSI gene encoding the protein retinoschisin. Retinoschisin is produced in the photoreceptor and bipolar cells and it is critical in maintaining the synaptic integrity of the retina.

Specifically the AAV 5 vector containing the wild-type human RSI cDNA driven by a mouse opsin promoter showed long-term retinal functional and structural recovery. Also the retinal structural reliability improved greatly after the treatment, characterized by an increase in the outer nuclear layer thickness.

==== Retinitis pigmentosa ====
Retinitis pigmentosa is an inherited disease which leads to progressive night blindness and loss of peripheral vision as a result of photoreceptor cell death. Most people who have RP are born with rod cells that are either dead or dysfunctional, so they are effectively blind at nighttime, since these are the cells responsible for vision in low levels of light. What follows often is the death of cone cells, responsible for color vision and acuity, at light levels present during the day. Loss of cones leads to full blindness as early as five years old, but may not onset until many years later. There have been multiple hypotheses about how the lack of rod cells can lead to the death of cone cells. Pinpointing a mechanism for RP is difficult because there are more than 39 genetic loci and genes correlated with this disease. In an effort to find the cause of RP, there have been different gene therapy techniques applied to address each of the hypotheses.

Different types of inheritance can attribute to this disease; autosomal recessive, autosomal dominant, X-linked type, etc. The main function of rhodopsin is initiating the phototransduction cascade. The opsin proteins are made in the photoreceptor inner segments, then transported to the outer segment, and eventually phagocytized by the RPE cells. When mutations occur in the rhodopsin the directional protein movement is affected because the mutations can affect protein folding, stability, and intracellular trafficking. One approach is introducing AAV-delivered ribozymes designed to target and destroy a mutant mRNA.

The way this system operates was shown in animal model that have a mutant rhodopsin gene. The injected AAV-ribozymes were optimized in vitro and used to cleave the mutant mRNA transcript of P23H (where most mutation occur) in vivo.

Another mutation in the rhodopsin structural protein, specifically peripherin 2 which is a membrane glycoprotein involved in the formation of photoreceptor outersegment disk, can lead to recessive RP and macular degeneration in human (19). In a mouse experiment, AAV2 carrying a wild-type peripherin 2 gene driven by a rhodopsin promoter was delivered to the mice by subretinal injection. The result showed improvement in photoreceptor structure and function which was detected by ERG (electroretinogram). The result showed improvement of photoreceptor structure and function which was detected by ERG. Also peripherin 2 was detected at the outer segment layer of the retina 2 weeks after injection and therapeutic effects were noted as soon as 3 weeks after injection. A well-defined outer segment containing both peripherin2 and rhodopsin was present 9-month after injection.

Since apoptosis can be the cause of photoreceptor death in most of the retinal dystrophies. It has been known that survival factors and antiapoptoic reagents can be an alternative treatment if the mutation is unknown for gene replacement therapy. Some scientists have experimented with treating this issue by injecting substitute trophic factors into the eye. One group of researchers injected the rod derived cone viability factor (RdCVF) protein (encoded for by the Nxnl1 (Txnl6) gene) into the eye of the most commonly occurring dominant RP mutation rat models. This treatment demonstrated success in promoting the survival of cone activity, but the treatment served even more significantly to prevent progression of the disease by increasing the actual function of the cones. Experiments were also carried out to study whether supplying AAV2 vectors with cDNA for glial cell line-derived neurotrophic factor (GDNF) can have an anti-apoptosis effect on the rod cells. In looking at an animal model, the opsin transgene contains a truncated protein lacking the last 15 amino acids of the C terminus, which causes alteration in rhodopsin transport to the outer segment and leads to retinal degeneration. When the AAV2-CBA-GDNF vector is administered to the subretinal space, photoreceptor stabilized and rod photoreceptors increased and this was seen in the improved function of the ERG analysis. Successful experiments in animals have also been carried out using ciliary neurotrophic factor (CNTF), and CNTF is being used as a treatment in human clinical trials.

==== AAV-based treatment for retinal neovascular diseases ====
Ocular neovascularization (NV) is the abnormal formation of new capillaries from already existing blood vessels in the eye, and this is a characteristics for ocular diseases such as diabetic retinopathy (DR), retinopathy of prematurity (ROP) and (wet form) age-related macular degeneration (AMD). One of the main players in these diseases is VEGF (Vascular endothelial growth factor) which is known to induce vessel leakage and which is also known to be angiogenic. In normal tissues VEGF stimulates endothelial cell proliferation in a dose dependent manner, but such activity is lost with other angiogenic factors.

Many angiostatic factors have been shown to counteract the effect of increasing local VEGF. The naturally occurring form of soluble Flt-1 has been shown to reverse neovascularization in rats, mice, and monkeys.

Pigment epithelium-derived factor (PEDF) also acts as an inhibitor of angiogenesis. The secretion of PEDF is noticeably decreased under hypoxic conditions allowing the endothelial mitogenic activity of VEGF to dominate, suggesting that the loss of PEDF plays a central role in the development of ischemia-driven NV. One clinical finding shows that the levels of PEDF in aqueous humor of human are decreased with increasing age, indicating that the reduction may lead to the development of AMD. In animal model, an AAV with human PEDF cDNA under the control of the CMV promoter prevented choroidal and retinal NV.

The finding suggests that the AAV-mediated expression of angiostatic factors can be implemented to treat NV. This approach could be useful as an alternative to frequent injections of recombinant protein into the eye. In addition, PEDF and sFlt-1 may be able to diffuse through sclera tissue, allowing for the potential to be relatively independent of the intraocular site of administration.
