= Nuclear layer =

Nuclear layer may refer to:

- Inner nuclear layer
- Outer nuclear layer
