= Plexiform layer =

Plexiform layer may refer to:

- Inner plexiform layer
- Outer plexiform layer
