= Limiting membrane =

Limiting membrane may refer to:

- External limiting membrane
- Internal limiting membrane
- Glial-limiting membrane
