= Retinal regeneration =

Rods, cones and nerve layers in the retina. The front (anterior) of the eye is on the left. Light (from the left) passes through several transparent nerve layers to reach the rods and cones (far right). A chemical change in the rods and cones send a signal back to the nerves. The signal goes first to the bipolar and horizontal cells (yellow layer), then to the amacrine cells and ganglion cells (purple layer), then to the optic nerve fibres. The signals are processed in these layers. First, the signals start as raw outputs of points in the rod and cone cells. Then the nerve layers identify simple shapes, such as bright points surrounded by dark points, edges, and movement. (Based on a drawing by Ramón y Cajal.)

Retinal regeneration refers to the restoration of vision in vertebrates that have suffered retinal lesions or retinal degeneration.

The two most well-studied mechanisms of retinal regeneration are cell-mediated regeneration and cellular transplantation. Regenerative processes may have applications in humans for treating degenerative retinal diseases, such as retinitis pigmentosa. While mammals, such as humans and mice, lack the innate ability to regenerate the retina, lower vertebrates, such as teleost fish and salamanders, are capable of regenerating lost retinal tissue in the event of damage.

== By creature ==
=== In zebrafish ===
Zebrafish, like other teleost fish, possess the innate ability to regenerate retinal damage. This ability combined with the considerable similarity between teleost and mammalian retinal structure makes zebrafish an attractive model for the study of retinal regeneration. Muller glia are a type of glial cell present in both the teleost and mammalian retina. Retinal regeneration in zebrafish is mediated by Muller glia, which dedifferentiate into stem-like cells and proliferate into neural progenitor cells in response to retinal damage. While Muller glia division is responsible for the regeneration of the retina in all cases of retinal damage, the case of photoreceptor loss due to light damage is particularly well characterized. In response to photoreceptor ablation, Muller glia dedifferentiate and undergo a single asymmetric division to produce a neural progenitor cell and a new Muller glia cell. The neural progenitor cell proliferates to form a cluster of neural progenitors, which migrate to the outer nuclear layer of the retina and differentiate into photoreceptors to replace the lost cells. This process restores retinal function to the injured fish. Understanding the underlying mechanisms may provide insight into treatment options for degenerative retinal diseases in mammals.

Several proteins and signaling pathways have been described and characterized in the process of retinal regeneration. The roles of a few important elements are summarized below:

Protein	General Role	Role in Retinal Regeneration
TNF-a	induces inflammation, induces apoptosis	signals Muller glia to dedifferentiate
Notch	regulates differentiation and cell fate determination	maintains Muller glial quiescence
N-cadherin	mediates cell-cell interactions, stimulates axonal guidance	guides neural progenitor cell migration
Ascl1	mediates neurogenesis	contributes to Muller glial dedifferentiation
β-catenin	actives the Wnt pathway	necessary for Muller glial proliferation

Rod precursor differentiation is another mechanism by which zebrafish can replace lost retinal neurons. Rod precursors are produced during normal zebrafish growth and localize to the outer nuclear layer of the retina. In the event of chronic or small-scale rod photoreceptor death, rod precursors proliferate and differentiate into new rod photoreceptors. This population of progenitor cells can be induced to proliferate by means such as injection of growth hormone or selective rod photoreceptor cell death. However, as this regenerative response is more limited than the Muller glia mediated response, much less is known about its underlying mechanisms.

=== In mice ===
Mice, like other mammals, do not show an innate capacity to regenerate retinal damage. Retinal damage in mammals instead typically results in gliosis and scar formation which interrupts normal retinal function. Previously, treating damaged eyes with epidermal growth factor induced Muller glia proliferation in the mouse eye, but neuron generation only occurred with concurrent overexpression of Ascl1. More recently, robust Muller glia proliferation and subsequent neuronal differentiation has been seen using the alpha 7 nAChR agonist, PNU-282987. More information on the signaling pathways involved is required before Muller glia mediated regeneration will be a viable treatment method for restoring vision in mammalian retinas.

Other approaches to retinal regeneration involve cellular transplantation treatments. In findings presented in the journal "Proceedings of the National Academy of Sciences" in 2012, a Nuffield Laboratory of Ophthalmology research team led by Dr Robert MacLaren from the University of Oxford restored sight to totally blind mice by injections of light-sensing cells into their eyes. The mice had suffered from a complete lack of photoreceptor cells in their retinas, and had been unable to tell light from dark. Promising results using the same treatment had been achieved with night-blind mice. Despite questions about the quality of restored vision, this treatment gives hope to people with dysfunctional vision and including degenerative eye diseases such as retinitis pigmentosa.

The procedure involved injecting rod precursors which formed an 'anatomically distinct and appropriately polarized outer nuclear layer' - two weeks later a retina had formed with restored connections and sight, proving that it was possible to reconstruct the entire light-sensitive layer. Researchers at Moorfields Eye Hospital had already been using human embryonic stem cells to replace the pigmented lining of the retina in patients with Stargardt's disease. The team is also restoring vision to blind patients with an electronic retinal implant which works on a similar principle of replacing the function of the light-sensing photoreceptor cells.

=== In humans ===
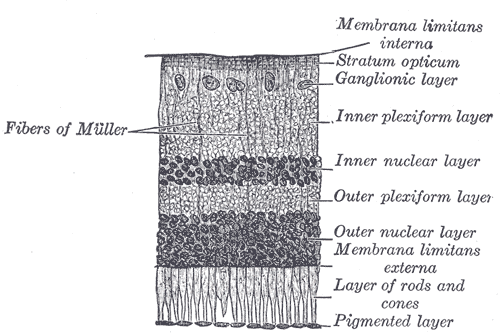
Section through retina

In February 2013, the US Food and Drug Administration approved the use of the Argus II Retinal Prosthesis System , making it the first FDA-approved implant to treat retinal degeneration. The device may help adults with RP who have lost the ability to perceive shapes and movement to be more mobile and to perform day-to-day activities.
