= Retinal nerve fiber layer =

Part of the eye

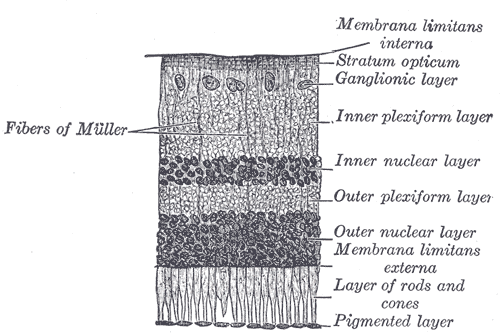
- Section of retina. (Stratum opticum labeled at right, second from the top.)

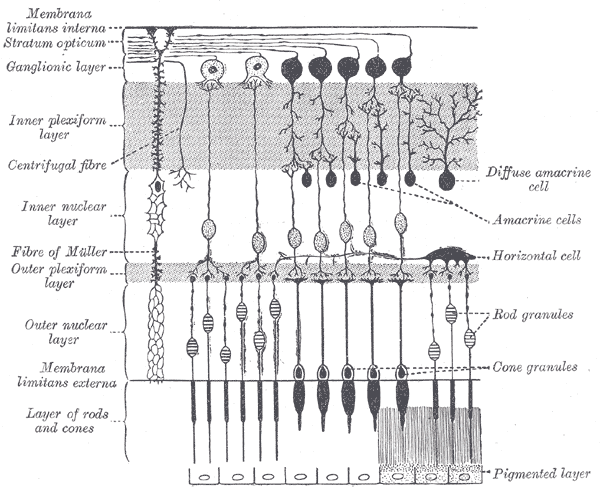
- Plan of retinal neurons. (Stratum opticum labeled at left, second from the top.)

Details

Identifiers
- Latin: stratum neurofibrarum retinae
- TA98: A15.2.04.017
- FMA: 58688

The retinal nerve fiber layer (RNFL) or nerve fiber layer, stratum opticum, is part of the anatomy of the eye.

== Physical structure ==
The RNFL formed by the expansion of the fibers of the optic nerve; it is thickest near the optic disc, gradually diminishing toward the ora serrata.

As the nerve fibers pass through the lamina cribrosa sclerae they lose their medullary sheaths and are continued onward through the choroid and retina as simple axis-cylinders.

When they reach the internal surface of the retina they radiate from their point of entrance over this surface grouped in bundles, and in many places arranged in plexuses.

Most of the fibers are centripetal, and are the direct continuations of the axis-cylinder processes of the cells of the ganglionic layer, but a few of them are centrifugal and ramify in the inner plexiform and inner nuclear layers, where they end in enlarged extremities.

== Measurement ==
RNFL measurement can be made by optical coherence tomography.

== Relation with diseases ==
=== RNFL reduction ===
==== Retinitis pigmentosa ====
Patients with retinitis pigmentosa have abnormal thinning of the RNFL which correlates with the severity of the disease. However the thickness of the RNFL also decreases with age and not visual acuity. The sparing of this layer is important in the treatment of the disease as it is the basis for connecting retinal prostheses to the optic nerve, or implanting stem cells that could regenerate the lost photoreceptors.

=== Asymmetric RNFL ===
RNFL asymmetry is the difference between the RNFL of the left and right eyes. In healthy patients, one study (2008, n=109) found asymmetry to be typically between 0-8μm, but occasionally higher, with average asymmetry of c.3μm at age 25 rising to 5μm at age 60. A 2011 study (n=284) concluded that RNFL asymmetry exceeding 9μm may be considered statistically significant and may be indicative of early glaucomatous damage. A 2023 study of 4034 children found mean RNFL of 106μm with SD of 9.4μm.

==== Optic neuritis ====
RNFL asymmetry has been proposed as a strong indicator of optic neuritis, with one small study proposing that asymmetry of 5–6μm was "a robust structural threshold for identifying the presence of a unilateral optic nerve lesion in MS." Optic neuritis is often associated with multiple sclerosis, and RNFL data may indicate the pace of future development of the MS.

==== Glaucoma ====
RNFL asymmetry may be produced by glaucoma. Glaucoma is a lead cause of irreversible blindness. Resesrch in RNFL and optic nerve head (ONH) abnormalities may enable early detection and diagnosis of glaucoma.

==== Fibromyalgia ====
One small study found that fibromyalgia patients had decreased RNFL thickness but another found no difference.

== Correlation with ethnicity ==
RNFL may vary with ethnicity.

== Other factors affecting RNFL ==
Some processes can excite RNFL apoptosis. Harmful situations which can damage RNFL include high intraocular pressure, high fluctuation on phase of intraocular pressure, inflammation, vascular disease and any kind of hypoxia. Gede Pardianto (2009) reported six cases of RNFL thickness change after the procedures of phacoemulsification. Sudden intraocular fluctuation in any kind of intraocular surgeries maybe harmful to RNFL in accordance with mechanical stress on sudden compression and also ischemic effect of micro emboly as the result of the sudden decompression that may generate micro bubble that can clog micro vessels.

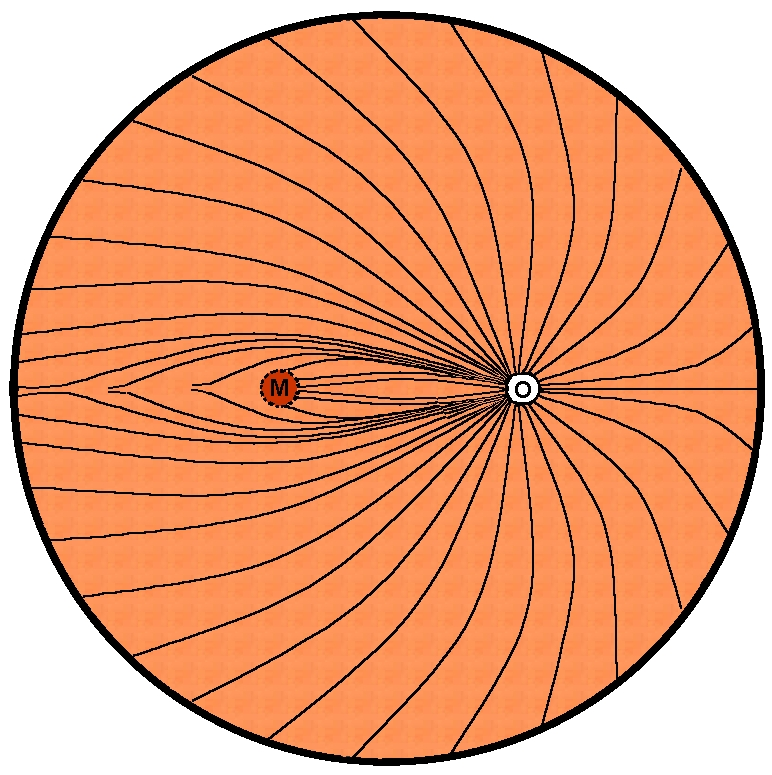
Pattern of retinal nerve fibers

== See also ==
- Ganglion cell layer
