= Infracyanine green =

Cyanine dye used in medical diagnostics

Infracyanine green (IFCG) is a cyanine dye used in medical diagnostics especially in ophthalmology. Unlike Indocyanine green (ICG) it is an iodine free dye.

== Properties ==
Pharmacological properties of infracyanine green are similar to ICG, l but it is free from iodine either as free ion or as part of the dye moiety. Since IFCG is iodine free, instead of ICG, it is used in patients with iodine allergy. Though it is impossible to be allergic to iodine as this would be incompatible with human life. It has a peak spectral absorption between 600 nm to 700 nm. IFCG can be dissolved in 5% glucose solution instead of pure water, which makes it less cytotoxic in rabbits macular applications.

== Uses ==
Infracyanine green which stains the Internal limiting membrane layer of retina, is used to see structures to be removed during vitreoretinal surgery.

== Toxicity ==
At a concentration above 0.05% IFCG may induce acute and chronic toxicities. But the retinal phototoxicity caused by IFCG is lesser compared to Indocyanine green in one study in cell cultures.
