= Neuropil =

Type of area in the nervous system

Details
- System: Nervous system

Identifiers
- Latin: neuropilus
- MeSH: D019581
- TH: H2.00.06.2.02005

Neuropil (or "neuropile") is any area in the nervous system composed of mostly unmyelinated axons, dendrites and glial cell processes that forms a synaptically dense region containing a relatively low number of cell bodies. The most prevalent anatomical region of neuropil is the brain which, although not completely composed of neuropil, does have the largest and highest synaptically concentrated areas of neuropil in the body. For example, the neocortex and olfactory bulb both contain neuropil.

White matter, which is mostly composed of myelinated axons (hence its white color) and glial cells, is generally not considered to be a part of the neuropil.

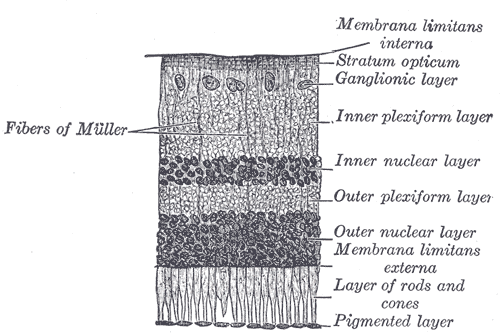

Neuropil (pl. neuropils) comes from the Greek: neuro, meaning "tendon, sinew; nerve" and pilos, meaning "felt". The term's origin can be traced back to the late 19th century.

== Location ==
Neuropil has been found in the following regions: outer neocortex layer, barrel cortex, inner plexiform layer and outer plexiform layer, posterior pituitary, and glomeruli of the cerebellum. These are all found in humans, with the exception of the barrel cortex, but many species have counterparts similar to our own regions of neuropil. However, the degree of similarity depends upon the composition of neuropil being compared. The concentrations of neuropil within certain regions are important to determine because simply using the proportions of the different postsynaptic elements does not verify the necessary, conclusive evidence. Comparing the concentrations can determine whether or not proportions of different postsynaptic elements contacted a particular axonal pathway. Relative concentrations could signify a reflection of different postsynaptic elements in the neuropil or show that axons sought out and formed synapses only with specific postsynaptic elements.

== Function ==
Since neuropils have a diverse role in the nervous system, it is difficult to define a certain overarching function for all neuropils. For instance, the olfactory glomeruli function as sorts of way-stations for the information flowing from the olfactory receptor neurons to the olfactory cortex. The inner plexiform layer of the retina is a little more complex. The bipolar cells post-synaptic to either rods or cones are either depolarized or hyperpolarized depending on whether the bipolar cells have sign-inverting synapses or a sign-conserving synapses.

=== Efficiency in the brain ===
Neurons are necessary for all connections made in the brain, and thus can be thought of as the "wires" of the brain. As in computing, an entity is most efficient when its wires are optimized; therefore, a brain which has undergone millions of years of natural selection would be expected to have optimized neural circuitry. To have an optimized neural system it must balance four variables—it must "minimize conduction delays in axons, passive cable attenuation in dendrites, and the length of 'wire' used to construct circuits" as well as "maximize the density of synapses", essentially optimizing the neuropil. Researchers at Cold Spring Harbor Laboratory formulated the optimal balance of the four variables and calculated the optimal ratio of axon plus dendrite volume (i.e. the "wire" volume or neuropil volume) to total volume of grey matter. The formula predicted an optimal brain with 3/5 (60%) of its volume occupied by neuropil. Experimental evidence taken from three mouse brains agrees with this result. The "fraction of wire is 0.59 ± 0.036 for layer IV of visual cortex, 0.62 ± 0.055 for layer Ib of piriform cortex, and 0.54 ± 0.035 for the stratum radiatum of hippocampal field CA1. The overall average is 0.585 ± 0.043; these values are not statistically different from the optimal 3/5."

== Clinical significance ==
=== Schizophrenia ===
It has been shown that a certain protein synaptophysin is lost in people with schizophrenia that causes dendrites and spines to deteriorate in the dorsolateral prefrontal cortex, a part of the neocortex, which plays a key role in information processing, attention, memory, orderly thinking and planning which are all functions that deteriorate in people with schizophrenia. The deterioration of the neuropil in this cortex has been proposed as a contributor to schizophrenia pathophysiology.

=== Alzheimer's disease ===
Alzheimer's is a neuropathological disease that is hypothesized to result from the loss of dendritic spines and/or deformation of these spines in the patient's frontal and temporal cortices. Researchers have tied the disease to a decrease in the expression of drebrin, a protein thought to play a role in long-term potentiation, meaning the neurons would lose plasticity and have trouble forming new connections. This malfunction presents itself in the form of helical filaments that tangle together in the neuropil. This same phenomenon seems to occur in the elderly as well.

== Other animals ==
=== Other mammals ===
A significant non-human area of neuropil is the barrel cortex found in mammals with whiskers (e.g. cats, dogs and rodents); each "barrel" in the cortex is a region of neuropil where the input from a single whisker terminates.

=== Invertebrates ===
The optic lobe of arthropods and the ganglia of the arthropod brain as well as the ganglia in the ventral nerve cord are unmyelinated and therefore belong to the class of neuropils.

More generally, because myelin and similar ensheathments of axons are later elaborations of nervous systems, almost all phyla of animals exhibiting any degree of concentration of the nervous system end up having neuropils. This is not only a recurring theme across bilaterians, but also in cnidarians.

== Research ==
Research has focused on where neuropil is found in many different species in order to unveil the range of significance it has and possible functions.

=== Recent studies ===
In chimpanzees and humans the neuropil provides a proxy measure of total connectivity within a local region because it is composed mostly of dendrites, axons, and synapses.

In insects the central complex plays an important role in higher-order brain function. The neuropil in Drosophila Ellipsoid is composed of four substructures. Each section has been observed in several insects as well as the influence it has on behavior, however the exact function of this neuropil has proven elusive. Abnormal walking behavior and flight behavior are controlled primarily by the central complex and genetic mutations that disrupt the structure support the hypothesis that the central complex neuropil is a site of behavioral control. However, only specific components of the behavior were affected with the genetic mutations. For example, basic leg coordination of walking was normal, whereas speed, activity, and turning were affected. These observations suggest that the central complex not only plays a role in locomotor behavior, but fine tuning as well. There is also additional evidence that the neuropil may function in olfactory associative learning and memory.

Research has shown reduced neuropil in area 9 of schizophrenics, as well as consistent findings of reduced spine density in layer III pyramidal neurons of the temporal and frontal cortices.

== See also ==
- Axon
- Dendrite
- Dendritic spine
- Glia
- Grey matter
- Neuroanatomy
- Synapse

== Sources ==
- Neuropil: Roche Encyclopedia of Medicine, Dictionary Barn.
- Gazzaniga, Richard B. Ivry; Mangun, George R.; Steven, Megan S. (2009). Cognitive neuroscience: the biology of the mind (3rd ed.). New York: W. W. Norton. ISBN 978-0-393-92795-5.
- Eric R. Kandel; James H. Schwartz; Thomas M. Jessell, eds. (2000). Principles of neural science (4th ed.). New York: McGraw-Hill, Health Professions Division. ISBN 978-0-8385-7701-1.
- Larry R. Squire; Stephen M. Kosslyn, eds. (1998). Findings and current opinion in cognitive neuroscience. Current Opinion in Neurobiology. Cambridge, Massachusetts: The MIT Press. ISBN 978-0-262-69204-5.
