= Sight restoration =

Sight restoration restores function to those who have visual impairments. Depending on the cause of the impairment, it can include:

- Cataract surgery: Restoring vision by removing an eye lens that has become opaque
- Corneal transplantation: Replacing a damaged or diseased cornea with a donor cornea, a form of organ transplantation
- Glaucoma surgery: Various procedures treat glaucoma, which affects the optic nerve
- LASIK: Surgery for the correction of myopia, hyperopia, and astigmatism
- Retinal regeneration: Addressing damage or disease to the retina
- Scleral buckle: Procedure to restore a detached retina
- Photopharmacology: Drugs with light-dependent activity that can restore the photoresponses of retinal neurons despite photoreceptor degeneration.
