= Retina bipolar cell =

Type of neuron

Retinal bipolar cell
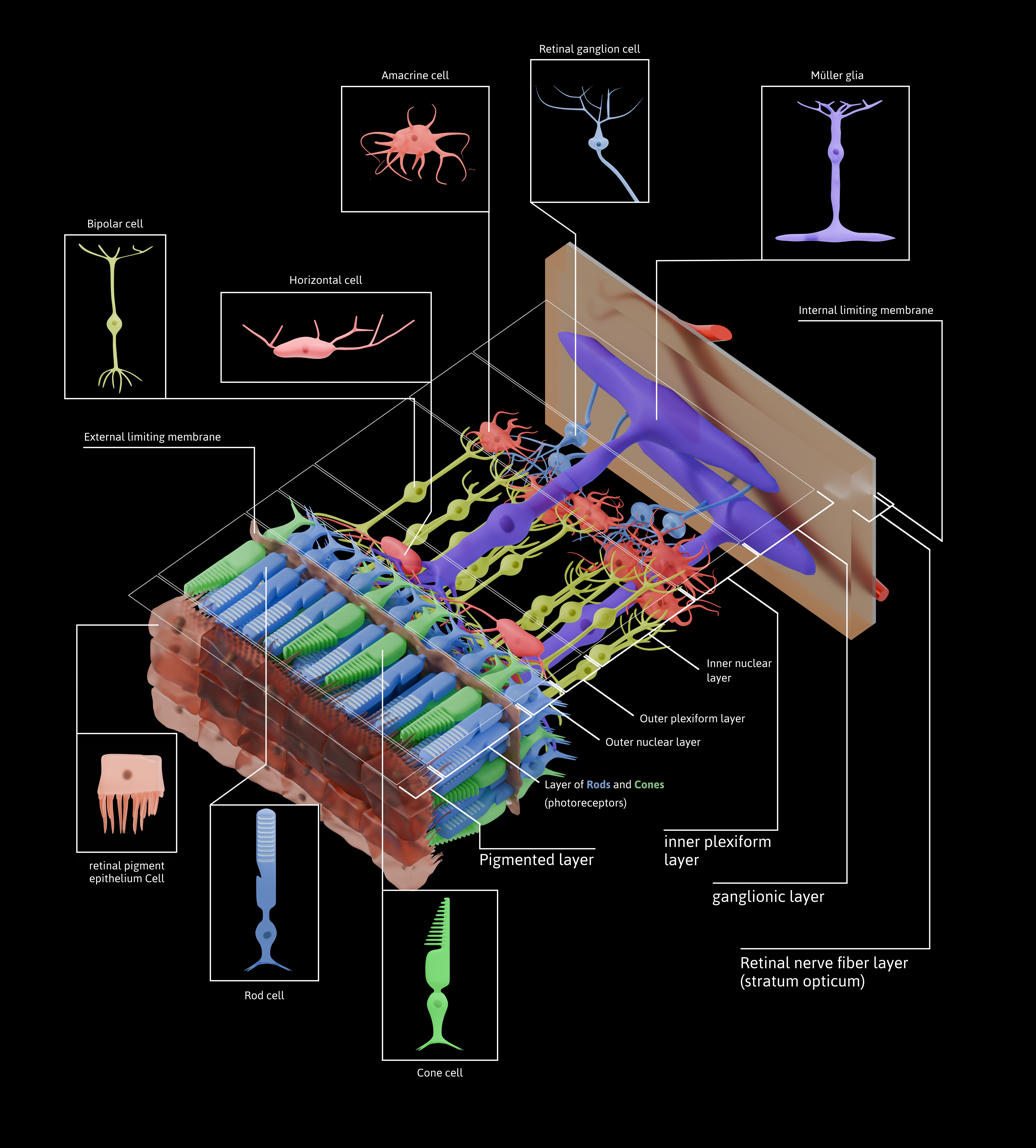
- Retina. Bipolar cells are labeled near the top left.

Details
- System: Visual system
- Location: Retina (inner nuclear layer)
- Shape: bipolar
- Function: Convey gradients between photoreceptor cells to retinal ganglion cells
- Neurotransmitter: Glutamate
- Presynaptic connections: Rods, cones and horizontal cells
- Postsynaptic connections: Retinal ganglion cells and amacrine cells

Identifiers
- MeSH: D051245
- NeuroLex ID: nifext_31
- FMA: 67749

As a part of the retina, bipolar cells exist between photoreceptors (rod cells and cone cells) and ganglion cells. They act, directly or indirectly, to transmit signals from the photoreceptors to the ganglion cells.

== Structure ==
Bipolar cells are so-named as they have a central body from which two sets of processes arise. They can synapse with either rods or cones (rod/cone mixed input BCs have been found in teleost fish but not mammals), and they also accept synapses from horizontal cells. The bipolar cells then transmit the signals from the photoreceptors or the horizontal cells, and pass it on to the ganglion cells directly or indirectly (via amacrine cells). Unlike most neurons, bipolar cells communicate via graded potentials, rather than action potentials.

== Function ==
Bipolar cells receive synaptic input from either rods or cones, or both rods and cones, though they are generally designated rod bipolar or cone bipolar cells. There are 11 distinct forms of cone bipolar cells, however, only one rod bipolar cell, due to the rod receptor likely arriving later in the evolutionary history than the cone receptor.. More rods (and therefore rod bipolars) are found at greater distances from central retina.

In the dark, a photoreceptor (rod/cone) cell will release glutamate, which inhibits (hyperpolarizes) the ON bipolar cells and excites (depolarizes) the OFF bipolar cells. In light, however, light strikes the photoreceptor cell which causes it to be inhibited (hyperpolarized) due to the activation of opsins which activate G-Proteins that activate phosphodiesterase (PDE) which cleaves cGMP into 5'-GMP. In photoreceptor cells, there is an abundance of cGMP in dark conditions, keeping cGMP-gated Na channels open and so, activating PDE diminishes the supply of cGMP, reducing the number of open Na channels and thus hyperpolarizing the photoreceptor cell, causing less glutamate to be released. This causes the ON bipolar cell to lose its inhibition and become active (depolarized), while the OFF bipolar cell loses its excitation (becomes hyperpolarized) and becomes silent.

Rod bipolar cells do not synapse directly on to ganglion cells. Instead, rod bipolar cells synapse on to a Retina amacrine cell, which in turn excite cone ON bipolar cells (via gap junctions) and inhibit cone OFF bipolar cells (via glycine-mediated inhibitory synapses) thereby overtaking the cone pathway in order to send signals to ganglion cells at scotopic (low) ambient light conditions.

OFF bipolar cells synapse in the outer layer of the inner plexiform layer of the retina, and ON bipolar cells terminate in the inner layer of the inner plexiform layer.

=== Signal transmission ===
Bipolar cells effectively transfer information from rods and cones to ganglion cells. The horizontal cells and the amacrine cells complicate matters somewhat. The horizontal cells introduce lateral inhibition to the dendrites and give rise to the center-surround inhibition which is apparent in retinal receptive fields. The amacrine cells also introduce lateral inhibition to the axon terminal, serving various visual functions including efficient signal transduction with high signal-to-noise ratio.

The mechanism for producing the center of a bipolar cell's receptive field is well known: direct innervation of the photoreceptor cell above it, either through a metabotropic (ON) or ionotropic (OFF) receptor. However, the mechanism for producing the monochromatic surround of the same receptive field is under investigation. While it is known that an important cell in the process is the horizontal cell, the exact sequence of receptors and molecules is unknown.

== See also ==
- Amacrine cell
- Retinal ganglion cell
- Center-surround antagonism
