= Starburst amacrine cell =

Type of interneuron in the retina of the eye

Starburst amacrine cells are a type of amacrine cells found in the retina. These interneurons are notable for co-releasing acetylcholine and GABA.

== See also ==
List of distinct cell types in the adult human body
