= External limiting membrane =

Retinal membrane at base of rods and cones

Details

Identifiers
- Latin: membrana limitans externa
- TA98: A15.2.04.011
- FMA: 58683

The external limiting membrane (or outer limiting membrane) is one of the ten distinct layers of the retina of the eye. It has a network-like structure and is situated at the bases of the rods and cones.

== Additional images ==
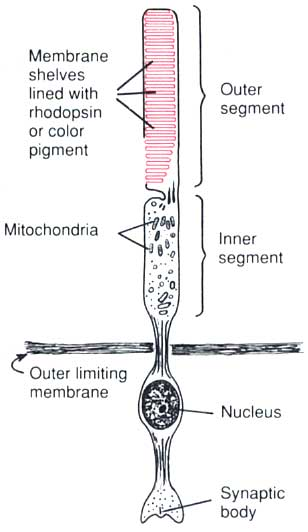
Rods and cones

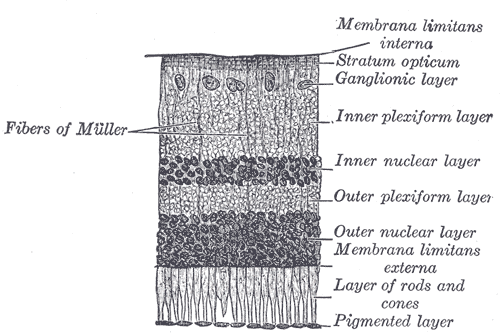
Section of retina. (Membrana limitans externa labeled at right, third from the bottom.)

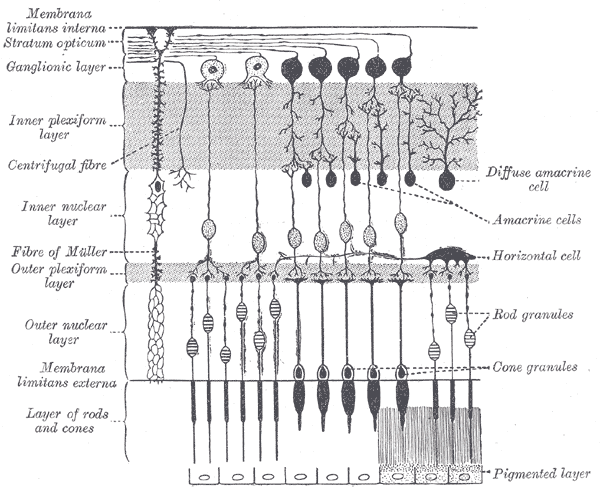
Plan of retinal neurons. (Membrana limitans externa labeled at left, second from the bottom.)

== See also ==
- Retina
