= Retinal mosaic =

Pattern of neurons on the retina

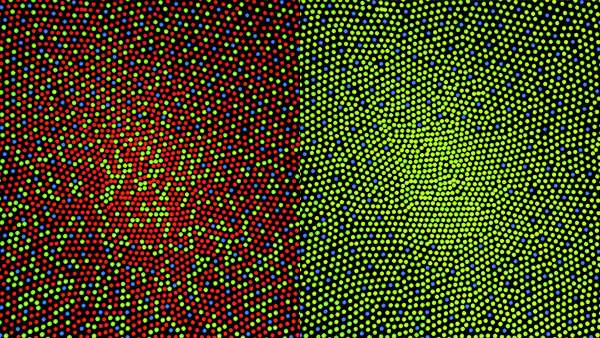
Illustration of the distribution of cone cells in the fovea of an individual with normal color vision (left), and a color blind (protanopic) retina. Note that the center of the fovea holds very few blue-sensitive cones.

Retinal mosaic is the name given to the distribution of any particular type of neuron across any particular layer in the retina. Typically such distributions are somewhat regular; it is thought that this is so that each part of the retina is served by each type of neuron in processing visual information.

The regularity of retinal mosaics can be quantitatively studied by modelling the mosaic as a spatial point pattern. This is done by treating each cell as a single point and using spatial statistics such as the Effective Radius, Packing Factor and Regularity Index.

Using adaptive optics, it is nowadays possible to image the photoreceptor mosaic (i.e. the distribution of rods and cones) in living humans, enabling the detailed study of photoreceptor density and arrangement across the retina.

In the fovea (where photoreceptor density is highest) the spacing between adjacent receptors is about 6-8 micrometer. This corresponds to an angular resolution of approximately 0.5 arc minute, effectively the upper limit of human visual acuity.
