= Amacrine cell =

Type of neuron in the retina

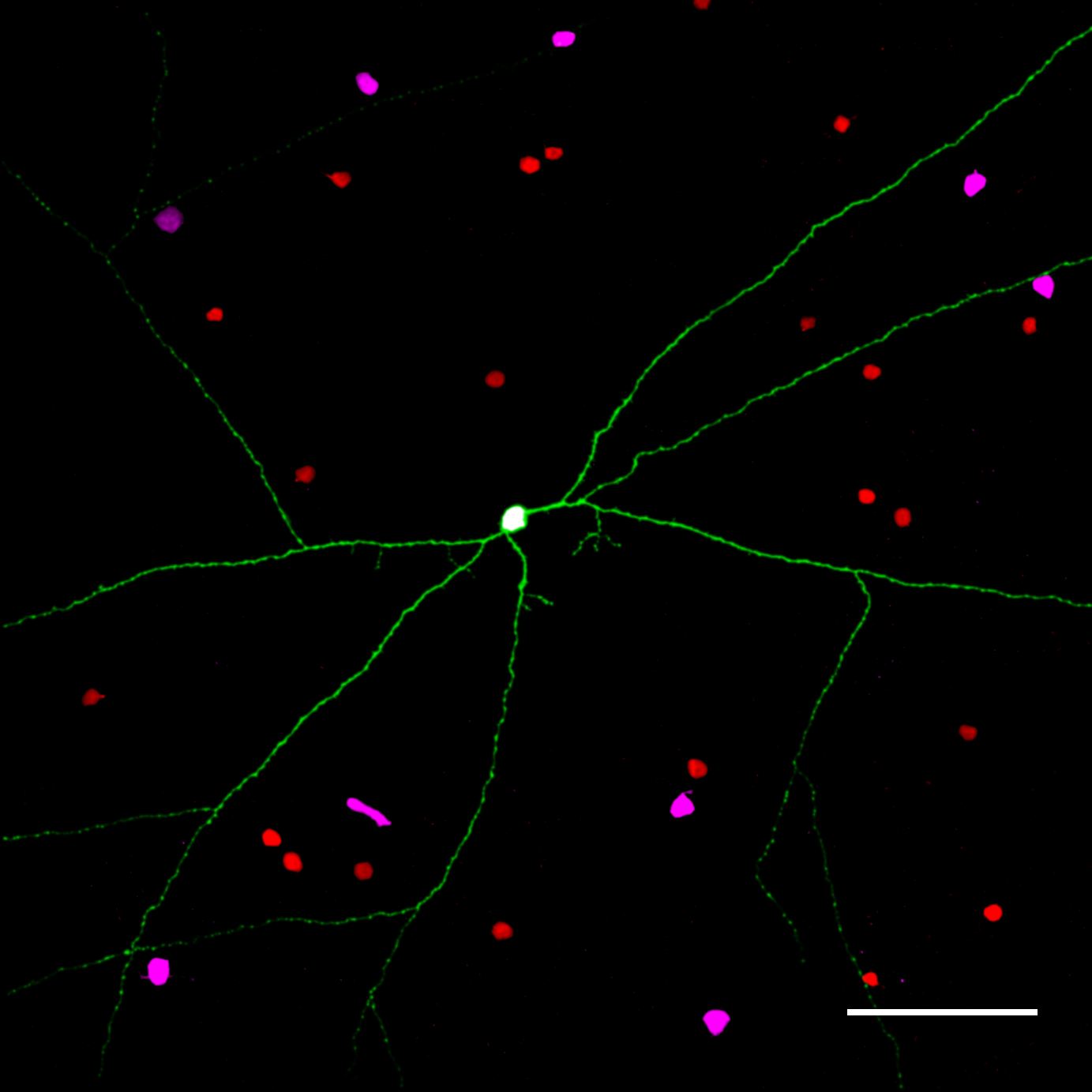
- Morphology of an nNOS-2 Amacrine Cell filled with neurobiotin (green) in an nNOS-Cre transgenic mouse retina; Ai9 reporter-driven expression of tdTomato is observed in both Ganglion Cell layer (magenta) and Inner Nuclear Layer (red) somata. Scale bar, 100 um.

Details
- Location: Inner nuclear layer and Ganglion cell layer of the retina
- Shape: Varies
- Function: inhibitory or neuromodulatory interneurons
- Neurotransmitter: gamma-Aminobutyric acid, glycine, DA, NO or 5-HT
- Presynaptic connections: Bipolar cells
- Postsynaptic connections: Bipolar cells and Ganglion cells

Identifiers
- MeSH: D025042
- NeuroLex ID: nifext_36
- FMA: 67766

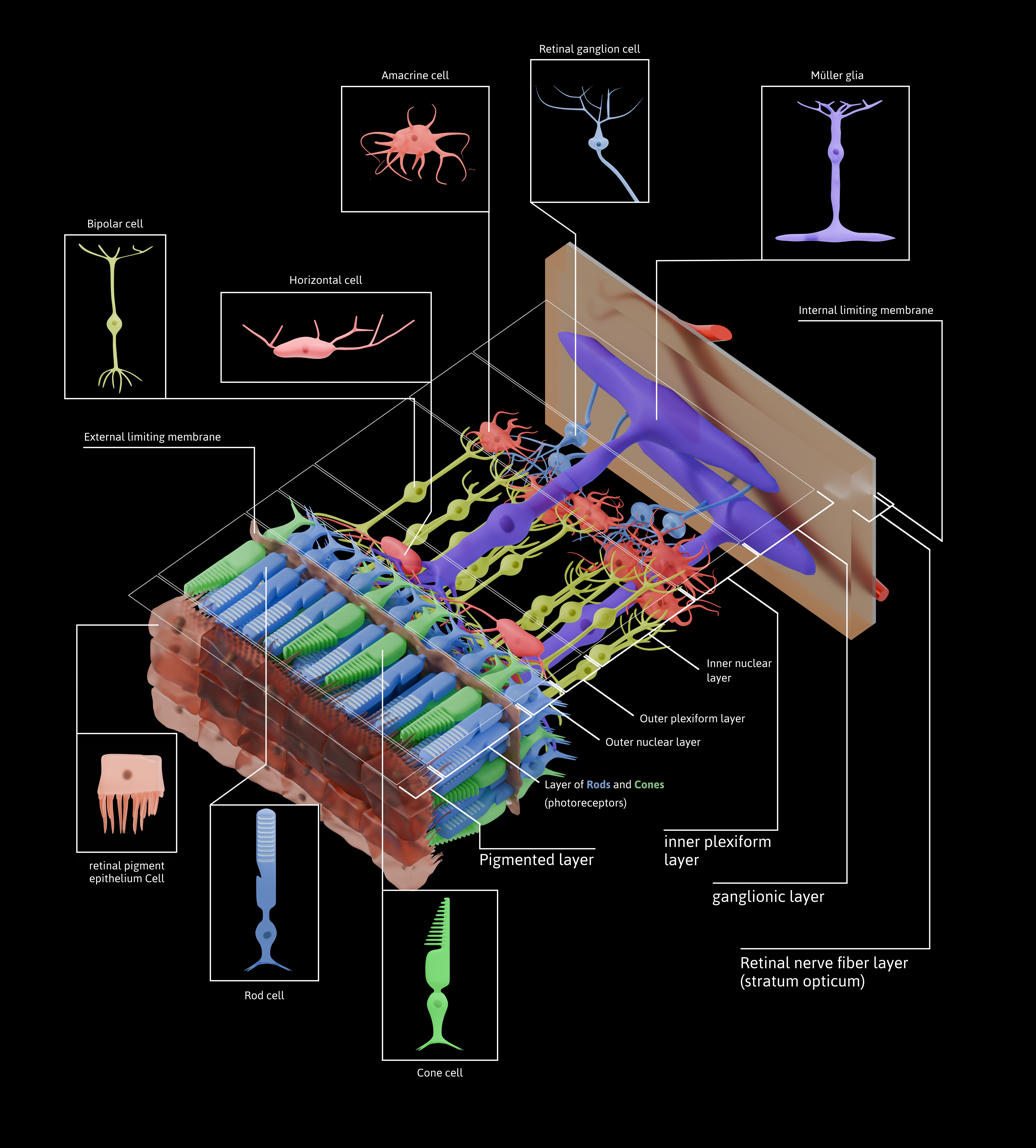
an orthographic cross-section of the layers of the human retina labeling various elements. amacrine cells are labeled near the top center

In the anatomy of the eye, amacrine cells are interneurons in the retina. They are named from Greek a– 'non', makr– 'long' and in– 'fiber', because of their short neuronal processes. Amacrine cells are inhibitory neurons which project their dendritic arbors onto the inner plexiform layer (IPL). They interact with retinal ganglion cells and bipolar cells.

== Structure ==
Amacrine cells operate at the inner plexiform layer (IPL), the second synaptic retinal layer where bipolar cells and retinal ganglion cells form synapses. There are at least 33 different subtypes of amacrine cells based just on their dendrite morphology and stratification. Like horizontal cells, amacrine cells work laterally, but whereas horizontal cells are connected to the output of rod and cone cells, amacrine cells affect the output from bipolar cells, and are often more specialized. Each type of amacrine cell releases one or several neurotransmitters where it connects with other cells.

They are often classified by the width of their field of connection, which layer(s) of the stratum in the IPL they are in, and by neurotransmitter type. Most are inhibitory using either gamma-Aminobutyric acid or glycine as neurotransmitters.

=== Types ===
As mentioned above, there are several different ways to divide the many different types of amacrine cells into subtypes.

GABAergic, glycinergic, or neither: Amacrine cells can be either GABAergic, glycinergic or neither depending on what inhibitory neurotransmitter they express (GABA, glycine, or neither). GABAergic amacrine cells are usually wide field amacrine cells and are found in the ganglion cell layer (GCL) and the inner nuclear layer (INL). One type of GABAergic amacrine cell that is fairly well studied is the starburst amacrine cell. These amacrine cells are usually characterised by their expression of choline acetyltransferase, or ChAT, and are known to play a role in direction selectivity and detection of directional motion. Acetylcholine is also released from these amacrine cells, but its function is not completely understood. Another subtype of GABAergic amacrine cells are those that are dopaminergic. These are all TH expressing and these amacrine cells modulate light adaption and circadian rhythm. These are widely spreading amacrine cells, and they diffusely release dopamine, while still releasing GABA and carrying out all normal synaptic release. Many other divisions of GABAergic amacrine cells have been noted, but those listed above are some of the most extensively researched and discussed.

Glycinergic amacrine cells aren't as extensively characterized as GABAergic amacrine cells. All glycinergic amacrine cells though, are marked by the glycine transporter GlyT1. One very well characterized glycinergic amacrine cell is the AII amacrine cells. These cells are present in the INL. One important function of the AII amacrine cells is that they capture cellular input from rod bipolar cells and redistribute it to cone bipolar cells using the synaptic endings of cone bipolar cells as adaptors

Around 15% of amacrine cells are neither GABAergic or glycinergic. These amacrine cells are sometimes known as nGnG amacrine cells, and it is thought that transcription factors that act on progenitors decide the fate of amacrine cells. One transcription factor that was found to be selectively expressed in nGnG amacrine cells is Neurod6

Length of dendritic arbors: Based on length, spread of dendritic arbors, amacrine cells can be categorized as narrow field amacrine cells (around 70 micrometers in diameter), medium field amacrine cells (around 170 micrometers in diameter) and wide field amacrine cells (around 350 micrometers in diameter). These different lengths lend to different specific functions that the amacrine cells can accomplish. Narrow field amacrine cells allow vertical communication among different retinal levels. They also aid in creating functional subunits in the receptive field of ganglion cells. These narrow field amacrine cells and their overlap in these subunits can allow certain ganglion cells to detect small amounts of movement of a very small spot in a field of vision. One type of narrow field cells that does this is the starburst amacrine cell.

Medium field amacrine cells also contribute to vertical communication in the cells of the retina, but much of their overall function is still unknown. Because their dendritic arbor size is pretty similar to that of ganglion cells, they could blur the edge of the ganglion cell visual field. Similarly, wide field amacrine cells are hard to research and even discover because they span the entire retina so there aren't many of them. In light of their size though, one of their main functions is lateral communication within a layer, though some also communicate vertically among layers.

=== Organization ===
Amacrine cells and other retinal interneuron cells are less likely to be near neighbours of the same subtype than would occur by chance, resulting in 'exclusion zones' that separate them. Mosaic arrangements provide a mechanism to distribute each cell type evenly across the retina, ensuring that all parts of the visual field have access to a full set of processing elements. MEGF10 and MEGF11 transmembrane proteins have critical roles in the formation of the mosaics by starburst amacrine cells and horizontal cells in mice.

== Function ==
In many cases, the subtype of the amacrine cell speaks to its function (form leads to function), but some specific functions of the retinal amacrine cells can be outlined.

- Intercept retinal ganglion cells and/ or bipolar cells in the IPL
- Create functional subunits within the receptive fields of many ganglion cells
- Contribute to vertical communication within the retinal layers
- Carry out paracrine functions such as release of dopamine, acetylcholine, and nitric oxide
- Through their connections with other retinal cells at synapses and release of neurotransmitters, contribute to the detection of directional motion, modulate light adaption and circadian rhythm, and control high sensitivity in scotopic vision through connections with rod and cone bipolar cells

There is still much to be discovered about all of the different functions of all of the different amacrine cells. Amacrine cells with extensive dendritic trees are thought to contribute to inhibitory surrounds by feedback at both the bipolar cell and ganglion cell levels. In this role they are considered to supplement the action of the horizontal cells.

Other forms of amacrine cell are likely to play modulatory roles, allowing adjustment of sensitivity for photopic and scotopic vision. The AII amacrine cell is a mediator of signals from rod cells under scotopic conditions.

== Classification ==
It was previously thought that all types of amacrine cells lack an axon. This is true for most amacrine cells; their dendrites contain input and output synapses, but they lack an axon. However, some types of amacrine cells have long axon-like processes that they use to integrate signals over long distances within the retina, but these do not exit the retina like ganglion cell axons.

According to a more recent form of classification of the neuronal layer of the retina, amacrine cells that have an axon are distinguished as a separate class of axonal cells, which, together with amacrine and ganglion cells, belong to the superclass of multipolar neurons.

== See also ==
- Bipolar cell of the retina
- Horizontal cell
- Photoreceptor cell
- Retinal ganglion cell
