= Center-surround antagonism =

Center-surround antagonism refers to antagonistic interactions between center and surround regions of the receptive fields of photoreceptor cells in the retina. Center surround antagonism enables edge detection and contrast enhancement within the visual cortex.
