= Ixoberogene soroparvovec =

Experimental gene therapy

Ixoberogene soroparvovec (Ixo-vec, also known as ADVM-022), is a gene therapy developed by Adverum Biotechnologies for wet age-related macular degeneration. It is delivered via the viral vector AAV.7m8.
