= Outer nuclear layer =

Layer of the retina

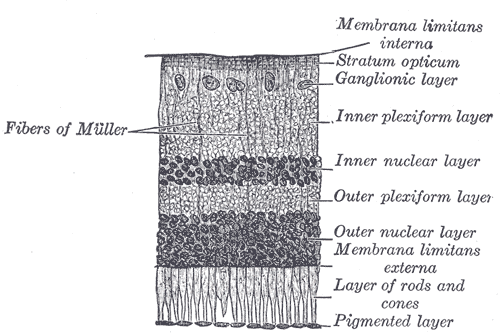
- Section of retina. (Outer nuclear layer labeled at right, fourth from the bottom.)

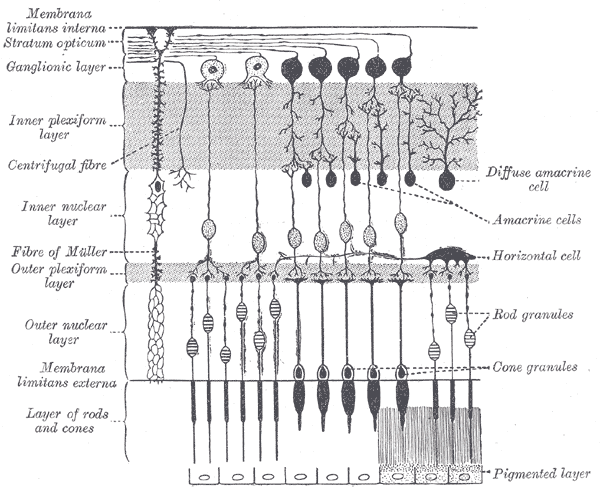
- Plan of retinal neurons. (Outer nuclear layer labeled at left, third from the bottom.)

Details

Identifiers
- Latin: stratum nucleare externum retinae
- TA98: A15.2.04.012
- FMA: 58684

The outer nuclear layer (or layer of outer granules or external nuclear layer), is one of the layers of the vertebrate retina, the light-detecting portion of the eye. Like the inner nuclear layer, the outer nuclear layer contains several strata of oval nuclear bodies; they are of two kinds, viz.: rod and cone granules, so named on account of their being respectively connected with the rods and cones of the next layer.

== Rod granules ==
The spherical rod granules are much more numerous, and are placed at different levels throughout the layer.

Their nuclei present a peculiar cross-striped appearance, and prolonged from either extremity of each cell is a fine process; the outer process is continuous with a single rod of the layer of rods and cones; the inner ends in the outer plexiform layer in an enlarged extremity, and is imbedded in the tuft into which the outer processes of the rod bipolar cells break up.

In its course it presents numerous varicosities.

== Cone granules ==
The stem-like cone granules, fewer in number than the rod granules, are placed close to the membrana limitans externa, through which they are continuous with the cones of the layer of rods and cones.

They do not present any cross-striation, but contain a pyriform nucleus, which almost completely fills the cell.

From the inner extremity of the granule a thick process passes into the outer plexiform layer, and there expands into a pyramidal enlargement or foot plate, from which are given off numerous fine fibrils, that come in contact with the outer processes of the cone bipolars.
