= Internal limiting membrane =

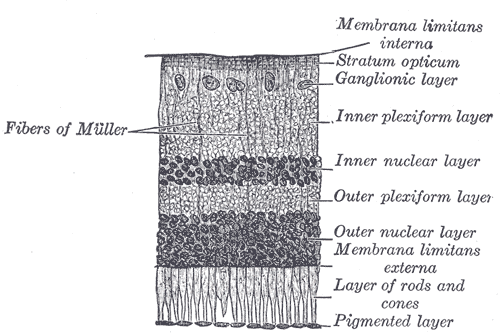
- Section of retina. (Membrana limitans interna labeled at right, at top)

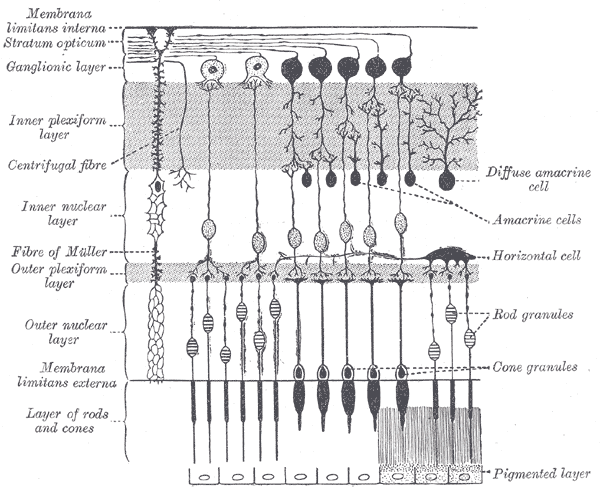
- Plan of retinal neurons. (Membrana limitans interna labeled at left, at top)

Details

Identifiers
- Latin: membrana limitans interna
- TA98: A15.2.04.018
- FMA: 58689

The internal limiting membrane, or inner limiting membrane, is the boundary between the retina and the vitreous body, formed by astrocytes and the end feet of Müller cells. It is separated from the vitreous body by a basal lamina.
