= Inner plexiform layer =

Area of the retina

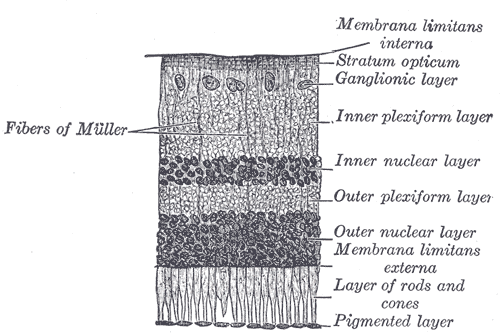
- Section of retina. (Inner plexiform layer labeled at right, fourth from the top.)

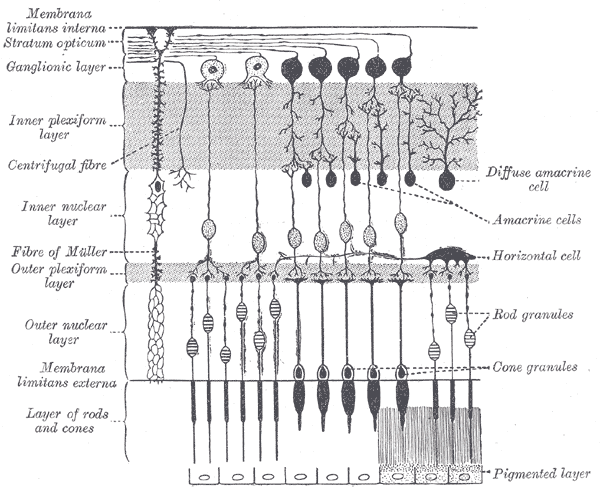
- Plan of retinal neurons. (Inner plexiform layer labeled at left, fifth from the top.)

Details

Identifiers
- Latin: stratum plexiforme internum retinae
- TA98: A15.2.04.015
- FMA: 58704

The inner plexiform layer is an area of the retina that is made up of a dense reticulum of fibrils formed by interlaced dendrites of retinal ganglion cells and cells of the inner nuclear layer. This is where amacrine and bipolar cells synapse at the dendrites of the ganglion cells. Within this reticulum a few branched spongioblasts are sometimes embedded. To isolate the ON and OFF signals bound for the brain, this layer has two sublaminae.. Signals from cone cells converge on two separate sublaminae: the inner ON-center for invaginating cone bipolar cells and a outer OFF-center for flat bipolar cells.
