= COX10 =

Mammalian protein found in Homo sapiens

Identifiers
- Aliases: COX10, heme A:farnesyltransferase cytochrome c oxidase assembly factor, cytochrome c oxidase assembly factor heme A:farnesyltransferase MC4DN3
- External IDs: OMIM: 602125; MGI: 1917633; HomoloGene: 80170; GeneCards: COX10; OMA:COX10 - orthologs

Gene location (Human)
Chr.	Chromosome 17 (human)
Band	17p12	Start	14,069,490 bp
Band	17p12	End	14,231,736 bp

Gene location (Mouse)
Chr.	Chromosome 11 (mouse)
Band	11|11 B3	Start	63,853,453 bp
Band	11|11 B3	End	63,970,294 bp
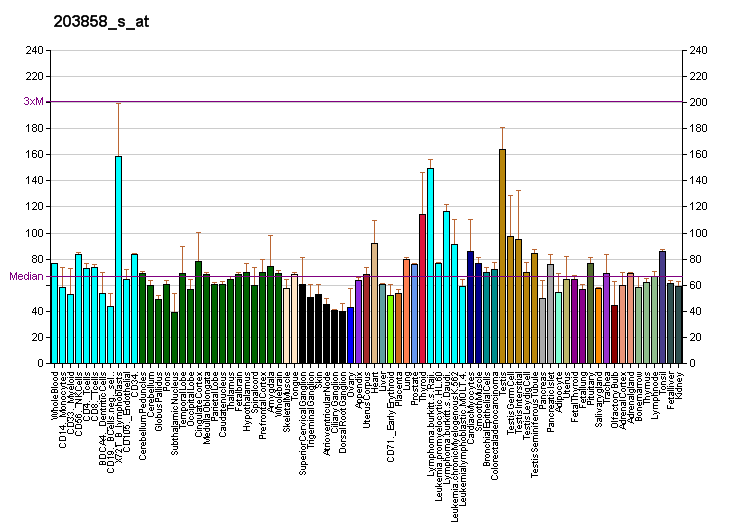
RNA expression pattern
Bgee	Human / Mouse (ortholog); Top expressed in: tibialis anterior muscle; thoracic diaphragm; myocardium of left ventricle; deltoid muscle; gastrocnemius muscle; triceps brachii muscle; vastus lateralis muscle; muscle of thigh; secondary oocyte; biceps brachii / Top expressed in: zygote; interventricular septum; otic vesicle; secondary oocyte; primary oocyte; muscle of thigh; myocardium of ventricle; skeletal muscle tissue; extraocular muscle; digastric muscle; More reference expression data
BioGPS	More reference expression data
Gene ontology
Molecular function	transferase activity; farnesyltranstransferase activity; cytochrome-c oxidase activity; protoheme IX farnesyltransferase activity; transferase activity, transferring alkyl or aryl (other than methyl) groups
Cellular component	integral component of membrane; membrane; mitochondrial membranes; cytochrome complex; mitochondrial inner membrane; nucleolus; mitochondrion; cytosol
Biological process	cytochrome complex assembly; mitochondrial fission; mitochondrion organization; heme biosynthetic process; aerobic respiration; mitochondrial electron transport, cytochrome c to oxygen; respiratory chain complex IV assembly; cellular respiration; heme O biosynthetic process; heme A biosynthetic process; proton transmembrane transport
Sources:Amigo / QuickGO
Orthologs
Species	Human	Mouse
Entrez	1352	70383
Ensembl	ENSG00000006695	ENSMUSG00000042148
UniProt	Q12887	Q8CFY5
RefSeq (mRNA)	NM_001303	NM_178379
RefSeq (protein)	NP_001294	NP_848466
Location (UCSC)	Chr 17: 14.07 – 14.23 Mb	Chr 11: 63.85 – 63.97 Mb
PubMed search
- Wikidata
View/Edit Human	View/Edit Mouse

Protoheme IX farnesyltransferase, mitochondrial is an enzyme that in humans is encoded by the COX10 gene. Cytochrome c oxidase (COX), the terminal component of the mitochondrial respiratory chain, catalyzes the electron transfer from reduced cytochrome c to oxygen. This component is a heteromeric complex consisting of 3 catalytic subunits encoded by mitochondrial genes and multiple structural subunits encoded by nuclear genes. The mitochondrially-encoded subunits function in electron transfer, and the nuclear-encoded subunits may function in the regulation and assembly of the complex. This nuclear gene, COX10, encodes heme A: farnesyltransferase, which is not a structural subunit but required for the expression of functional COX and functions in the maturation of the heme A prosthetic group of COX. A gene mutation, which results in the substitution of a lysine for an asparagine (N204K), is identified to be responsible for cytochrome c oxidase deficiency. In addition, this gene is disrupted in patients with CMT1A (Charcot-Marie-Tooth type 1A) duplication and with HNPP (hereditary neuropathy with liability to pressure palsies) deletion.

== Structure ==
The COX10 gene is located on the p arm of chromosome 17 in position 12 and spans 139,277 base pairs. The gene produces a 48.9 kDa protein composed of 443 amino acids. This gene has an unusually long 3' untranslated region measuring 1426 base pairs, compared to a 1329 base pair open reading frame. The COX10 gene has 7 exons totaling 135 kilobases in length. This protein is predicted to contain 7-9 transmembrane domains localized in the mitochondrial inner membrane. There are hydrophilic loops between transmembrane domains II/III and VI/VII. This protein is considered a constituent of the mitochondrial inner membrane.

== Function ==
The protein encoded by COX10 is an assembly factor essential to COX synthesis, participating in the first step of the mitochondrial heme A biosynthetic pathway. It catalyzes the farnesylation of the vinyl group at position C2 of protoheme (heme B) and converts it to heme O.

== Clinical Significance ==
Mutations in the COX10 gene can result in numerous clinical phenotypes, from tubulopathy and leukodystrophy to Leigh syndrome to fatal infantile cardiomyopathy to a French Canadian form of Leigh Syndrome. A wide variety of symptoms encompassing the entire range of COX deficiency symptoms have been reported, including ataxia, hypotonia, ptosis, lactic acidosis, proximal tubulopathy, anemia, myopathy, hypertrophic cardiomyopathy, sensorineural hearing loss, and leukodystrophy.

In addition, this gene is disrupted in patients with CMT1A (Charcot-Marie-Tooth type 1A) duplication and with HNPP (hereditary neuropathy with liability to pressure palsies) deletion.

== Interactions ==
This protein interacts with FAM136A.
