= Retinalophototroph =

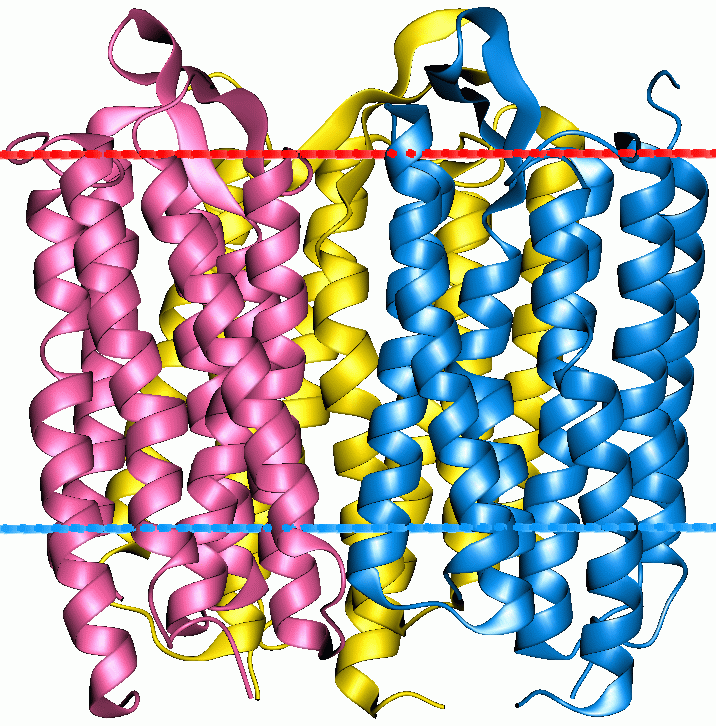
Many microbial rhodopsins, such as this bacteriorhodopsin, are ion pumps that convert light to chemical energy.

A retinalophototroph is one of two different types of phototrophs, and are named for retinal-binding proteins (microbial rhodopsins) they utilize for cell signaling and converting light into energy. Like all phototrophs, retinalophototrophs absorb photons to initiate their cellular processes. In contrast with chlorophototrophs, retinalophototrophs do not use chlorophyll or an electron transport chain to power their chemical reactions. This means retinalophototrophs are incapable of traditional carbon fixation, a fundamental photosynthetic process that transforms inorganic carbon (carbon contained in molecular compounds like carbon dioxide) into organic compounds. For this reason, experts consider them to be less efficient than their chlorophyll-using counterparts, chlorophototrophs.

== Energy conversion ==
Retinalophototrophs achieve adequate energy conversion via a proton-motive force. In retinalophototrophs, proton-motive force is generated from rhodopsin-like proteins, primarily bacteriorhodopsin and proteorhodopsin, acting as proton pumps along a cellular membrane.

To capture photons needed for activating a protein pump, retinalophototrophs employ organic pigments known as carotenoids, namely beta-carotenoids. Beta-carotenoids present in retinalophototrophs are unusual candidates for energy conversion, but they possess high Vitamin-A activity necessary for retinaldehyde, or retinal, formation. Retinal, a chromophore molecule configured from Vitamin A, is formed when bonds between carotenoids are disrupted in a process called cleavage. Due to its acute light sensitivity, retinal is ideal for activation of proton-motive force and imparts a unique purple coloration to retinalophototrophs. Once retinal absorbs enough light, it isomerizes, thereby forcing a conformational (i.e., structural) change among the covalent bonds of the rhodopsin-like proteins. Upon activation, these proteins mimic a gateway, allowing passage of ions to create an electrochemical gradient between the interior and exterior of the cellular membrane. Ions diffusing outwards across the gradient through proton pumps are then bound to ATP synthase proteins on the cell's surface. As they diffuse back into the cell, their protons catalyze the creation of ATP (from ADP and a phosphorus ion), providing energy for retinalophototrophic self-sustenance and proliferation.

== Interaction with carbon ==
Many, if not all, retinalophototrophs are photoheterotrophs: although sufficient ATP is produced by light, they cannot subsist on light and inorganic substances alone because they cannot produce needed organic materials from only CO_{2}. This category includes retinalophototrophs that perform anaplerotic fixation, such as a flavobacterium that can use pyruvate and CO_{2} to make malate. This ability does, however, help "stretch" limited supplies of carbon.

== Taxonomy ==
Retinalophototrophs are found across all domains of life but predominantly in the Bacteria and Archaea taxonomic groups. Scientists believe retinalophototroph's general ecological abundance correlates to horizontal gene transfer since only two genes are required for retinalophototrophy to occur: essentially, one gene for retinal-binding protein synthesis (bop) and one for retinal chromophore synthesis (blh).

== Interactions with environment ==
Despite their apparent simplicity, retinalophototrophs boast versatile ion usage that translates to their existence in relatively extreme environments. For instance, retinalophototrophs can thrive at depths over 200 meters where, despite a lack of inorganic carbon, sufficient light as well as sodium, hydrogen, or chloride concentrations harbor conditions capable of supporting their vital metabolic processes. Studies have also shown sodium and hydrogen ions correlate directly with retinalophototroph's nutrient uptake and ATP synthesis, while chloride drives processes responsible for osmotic equilibrium. Even though retinalophototrophs are widespread, research has shown they can be niche too. Depending on their proximity to the oceans surface, retinalophototrophs have evolved to be better at absorbing light within specific wavelengths. Most importantly, retinalophototrophs prevalence as a primary producer contributes substantially to the bottom-up mechanics of marine environments and, consequently, success of fauna and flora worldwide.

Although retinalophototrophs are less efficient at converting light than chlorophototrophs, the simplicity makes it the preferred system in a large number of environments. For example, because retinalophototrophs requires no iron in the reaction center, they are well-adapted to the iron-poor ocean environment. At high light level, they are more efficient in terms of protein investment to energy output due to the small size.
