= Purple Earth hypothesis =

Astrobiological hypothesis regarding early photosynthetic organisms

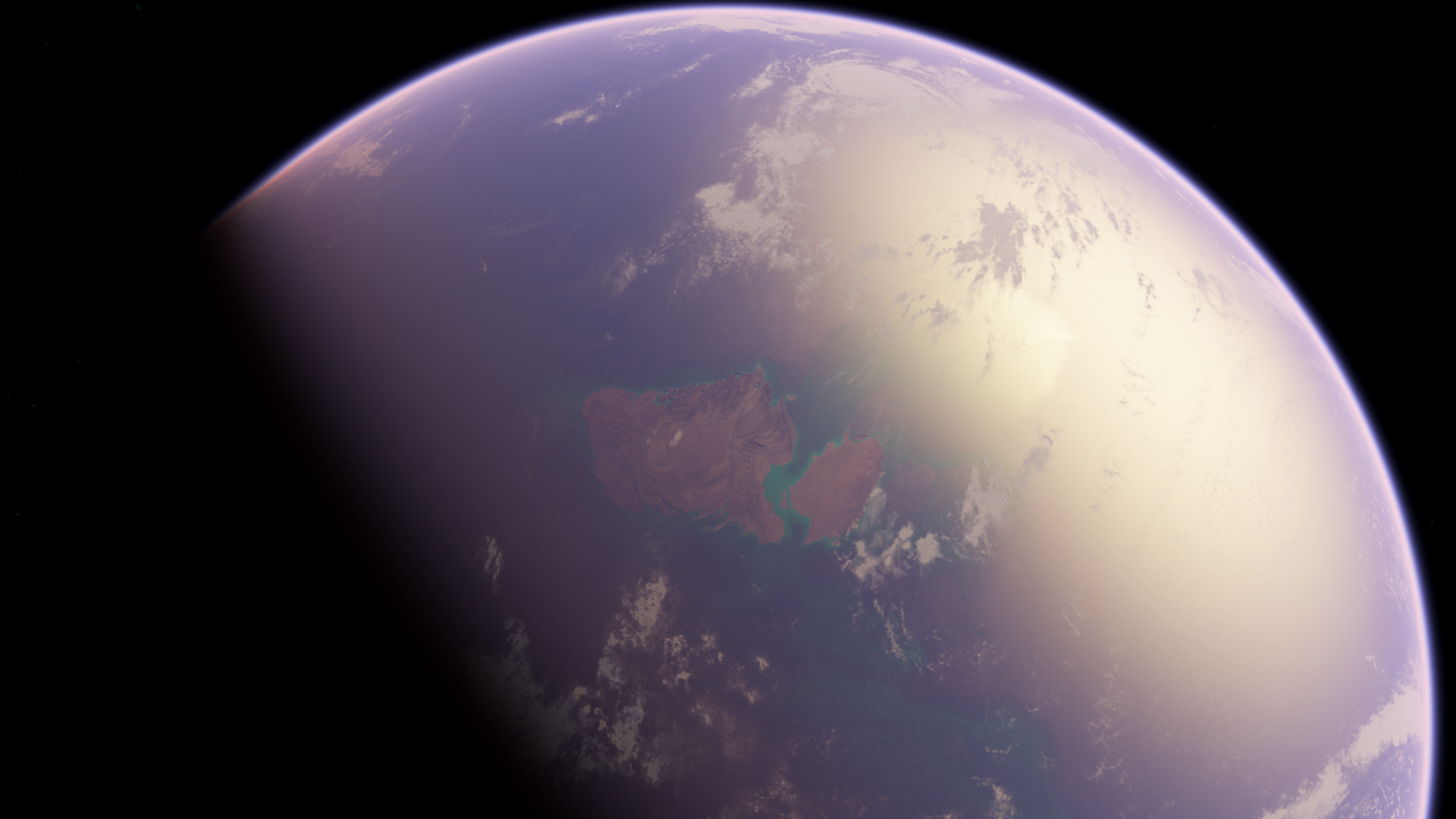
Artist's impression of Earth in the early Archean with a purplish hydrosphere and coastal regions

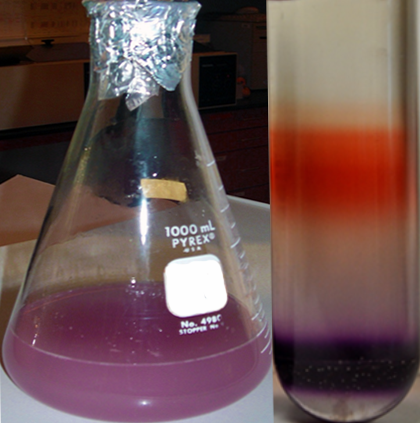
Purple culture of Haloarchaea (left) and isolated purple and red membrane components (right)

The Purple Earth hypothesis (PEH) is an astrobiological hypothesis, first proposed by molecular biologist Shiladitya DasSarma in 2007, that the earliest photosynthetic life forms of Early Earth were based on the simpler molecule retinal rather than the more complex porphyrin-based chlorophyll, making the surface biosphere appear purplish rather than its current greenish color. It is estimated to have occurred between 3.5 and 2.4 billion years ago during the Archean eon, prior to the Great Oxygenation Event and Huronian glaciation.

Retinal-containing cell membranes exhibit a single light absorption peak centered in the energy-rich green-yellow region of the visible spectrum, but transmit and reflect red and blue light, resulting in a purple color. Chlorophyll pigments, in contrast, absorb red and blue light, but little or no green light, which results in the characteristic green reflection of plants, cyanobacteria, green algae, and other organisms with chlorophyllic organelles. The simplicity of retinal pigments in comparison to the more complex chlorophyll, their association with isoprenoid lipids in the cell membrane, as well as the discovery of archaeal membrane components in ancient sediments on the Early Earth are consistent with an early appearance of life forms with purple membranes prior to the turquoise of the Canfield ocean and later green photosynthetic organisms.

== Evidence ==
The discovery of archaeal membrane components in ancient sediments on the Early Earth supports the PEH because these lipids are linked to archaeal retinal, a primitive light-harvesting pigment instead of chlorophyll, suggesting that early Earth's biosphere was purple and powered by retinal before the advent of chlorophyll-based photosynthesis which was introduced during the Great Oxygenation Event.

== Modern examples of retinal-based photosynthesis ==
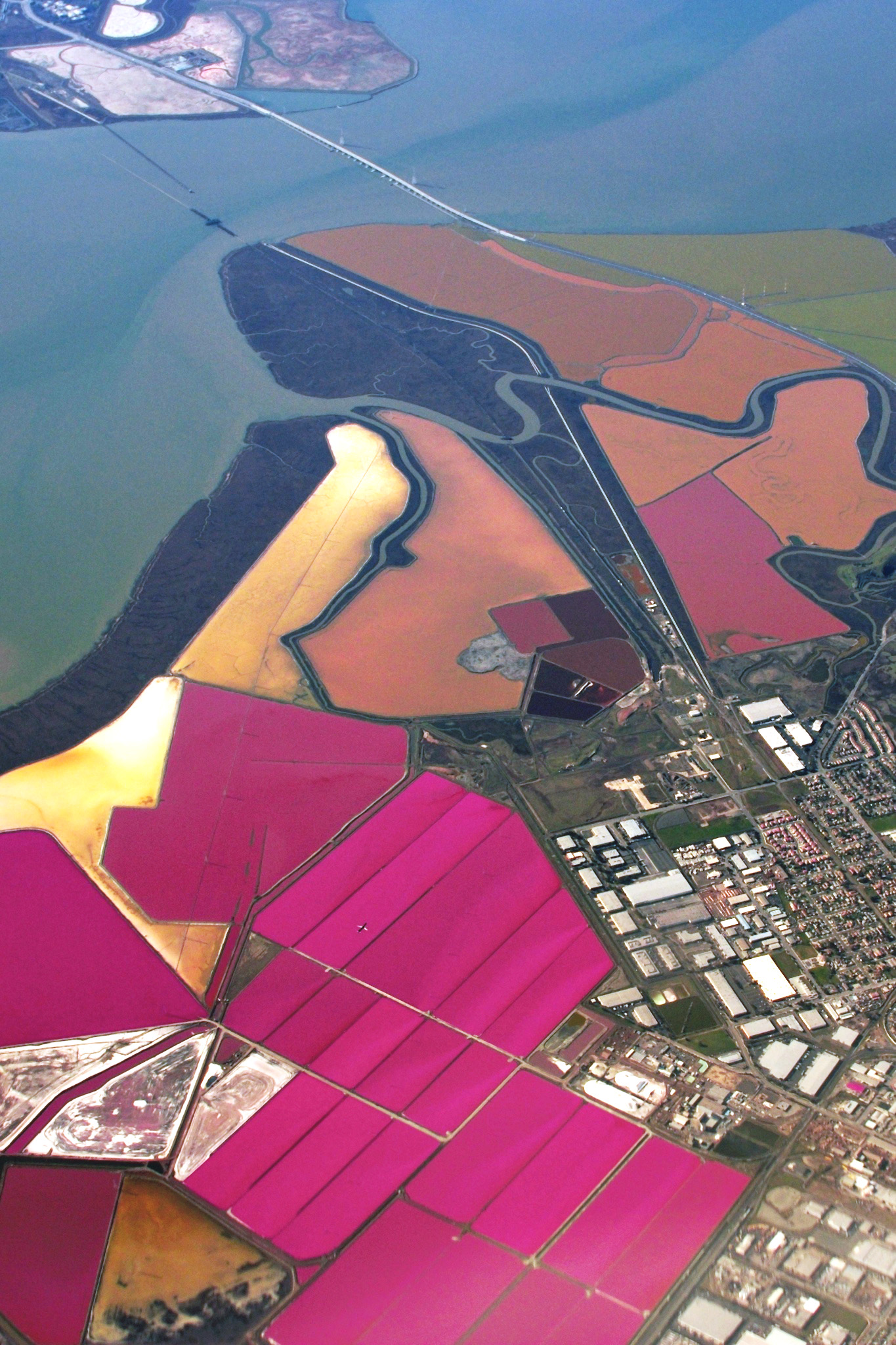
San Francisco Bay salt ponds with pink-colored Haloarchaea

An example of retinal-based organisms that exist today are photosynthetic microbes collectively called Haloarchaea. Many Haloarchaea contain the retinal derivative protein bacteriorhodopsin in their cell membrane, which carries out photon-driven proton pumping, generating a proton-motive gradient across the membrane and driving ATP synthesis. The process is a form of anoxygenic photosynthesis that does not involve carbon fixation, and the haloarchaeal membrane proton pump constitutes one of the simplest known bioenergetic systems for harvesting light energy.

== Evolutionary history ==
Microorganisms with purple and green photopigments frequently co-exist in stratified colonies known as microbial mats, where they may utilize complementary regions of the solar spectrum. Co-existence of purple and green pigment-containing microorganisms in many environments suggests their co-evolution.

It is possible that the Early Earth's biosphere was initially dominated by retinal-powered archaeal colonies that absorbed all the green light, leaving the eubacteria that "lived in their shadows" to evolve utilizing the residual red and blue light spectrum. However, when porphyrin-based photoautotrophs evolved and started to photosynthesize, which included both the primitive purple bacteria using bacteriochlorophyll and cyanobacteria using chlorophyll, highly reactive dioxygen was released as a byproduct of water splitting and started to accumulate, first in the ocean and then in the atmosphere. Over the course of a billion years, large enough quantities of oxygen had been produced, the reducing capabilities of chemical compounds on the Earth's surface were depleted, and the once-reducing atmosphere eventually became a permanently oxidizing one with abundant free oxygen molecules — an event known as Great Oxygenation Event. This coincided with a 300 million year-long global ice age at beginning of the Proterozoic known as the Huronian glaciation (which might also have been partly caused by the oxidative depletion of the atmospheric methane — a powerful greenhouse gas — due to the Great Oxygenation) and devastated the anaerobic biota, leaving the niches open for eubacteria that evolved antioxidant capabilities (both the aerobic proteobacteria and the photosynthetic cyanobacteria) to exploit and prosper. This also forced the surviving anaerobes to either live only in anoxic waters and deep sea oxygen minimum zones, or adapt a symbiotic life among aerobes (whose colonies would sometimes consume enough free oxygen to create pockets of hypoxia where anaerobes can thrive), which might have paved way for the long-term endosymbiosis between anaerobic archaea and aerobic eubacteria (which evolved into mitochondria) that enabled eukaryotes to evolve.

However, the porphyrin-based nature of chlorophyll had created an evolutionary trap, dictating that chlorophyllic organisms cannot re-adapt to absorb the energy-rich and now-available green light, and therefore ended up reflecting and presenting a greenish color. The subsequent success of more advanced chlorophyllic organisms (particularly green algae and early plants) in terrestrial colonization created an overall green biosphere all over Earth.

== Implications for astrobiology ==
Astrobiologists have suggested that retinal pigments may serve as a biosignature, a remotely detectable sign of extraterrestrial life on exoplanets. Historically, scientists sought out planets reflecting light in the green-yellow range as possible hosts to photosynthetic organisms, due to the implied presence of chlorophyll. The Purple Earth hypothesis suggests that search methods should be expanded to planets reflecting blue and red light, since evolution of retinal-based photosynthesis is also probable, or possibly even more likely than the evolution of chlorophyllic systems.

== See also ==
- Microbial rhodopsin
  - Bacteriorhodopsin — A proton pump used by Haloarchaea to harvest light energy.
  - Archaerhodopsin — A family of retinal-containing photoreceptor proteins found in Halobacterium and Halorubrum
- Boring Billion — a later phase during the Proterozoic when the seas may have been turquoise.
- Red edge – Region of change in vegetation reflectance
