= Bacterial rhodopsin =

Bacterial rhodopsin may refer to:

- Microbial rhodopsin, also known as type-I rhodopsin
- Bacteriorhodopsin, a type of microbial rhodopsin
