= Beja =

Beja may refer to:

== Ethnicity ==
- Beja people, an ethnic group in northeast Africa
  - Blemmyes, historical name for this people in the ancient world
- Beja language, language spoken by the Beja people
- Beja Congress, a group formed primarily of Beja opposing the government of Sudan

== Places ==
- Beja, Portugal, a city in Portugal
  - Beja District, its district
  - Beja Airbase, the nearby military airbase
  - Beja Airport, the nearby civilian airport
  - Castle of Beja, the castle
  - Convent of Beja, the former convent, now a museum
- Béja, a town in Tunisia
  - Béja Governorate, the governorate of which it is the capital
- Beja, Latvia, a village in Jaunalūksne Parish, Alūksne Municipality
- Beja State, a former princely state of India
- Beja, Kapurthala, a village in Punjab State, India

=== Association football ===
- C.D. Beja, an association football club based in Beja, Portugal
- Beja Football Association, which administers lower-tier football in the Beja District
- Olympique Béja, an association football club based in the town of Béja, Tunisia

== Surname ==
- Fatos Beja, (born 1948), Albanian politician
- Oded Beja, Israeli microbiologist
- Olinda Beja (born 1946), São Tomé and Príncipe poet and writer
- Duke of Beja, a Portuguese noble title
