= Battle of Aïn Charbou =

- Part of Shabiyan revolt
Date	1613
Location	Aïn Charbou, near Tébessa, Algeria
Result	Shabiyan victory

Belligerents
Emirate of Shabiyan	Beylik of Tunis

Commanders and leaders
Abd al-Samed al-Shabi	Murad I Bey

Strength
Unknown	2,000 cavalrymen

Casualties and losses
Unknown	150 killed

The Battle of Aïn Chabou was an engagement between the forces of Abd al-Samad al-Shabi and those of Murad Bey, fought as part of the conflict between the Shabiyya and the authorities of the Beylik of Tunis. The battle took place at Aïn Chabou, near Tébessa, in a region between the Tell and the Sahara.

== Background ==
After the death of the former emir, Muhammad Zafzaf, Abd al-Samad al-Shabi succeeded him in 1577 and continued the struggle against the Ottoman Empire in northwestern Tunisia. He allied himself with Arab and Berber tribes with the aim of retaking Kairouan, which had been captured by the Ottomans during this period.

== Battle ==
Murad I Bey’s army, consisting of approximately 2,000 cavalrymen, advanced towards the Shabiyya camp at Aïn Chabou. Along the way, they encountered a hunter from the Hanencha tribe, an ally of the Shabiyya, and questioned him about the whereabouts of Abd al-Samad al-Shabi. The two forces subsequently clashed at Aïn Chabou, where Murad I Bey’s army was defeated and forced to retreat. The Shabiyya forces pursued the retreating cavalry as far as Beja before returning to their camp. Murad I Bey’s forces reportedly suffered around 150 fatalities.

== Sources ==
- Ben Haidah, Youssef (2020). The tribe's relationship with the Sufi way in Algeria and Tunisia during the modern (The Al-HananchaAnd the -Chabbia model) (in Arabic).
- Ben Zirda, Tawfik (2013). الكنفدراليات القبلية الحدودية ودورها في العلاقات الاقتصادية والثقافية بين الجزائر وتونس خلال العهد العثماني (PDF) (in Arabic). كلية الآداب والحضارة الإسلامية.
