= Oded Beja =

Israeli researcher

Oded Béjà
- עודד בז'ה
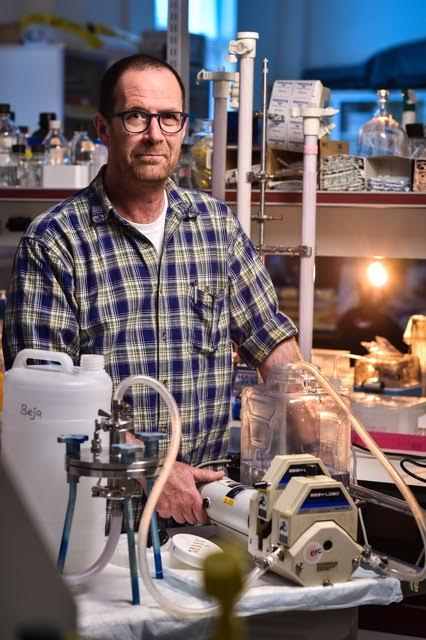
- Born: January 29, 1964 (age 62)
- Education: Hebrew University, Weizmann Institute of Science
- Known for: Bacterial Rhodopsin discovery, Viral Photosynthesis
- Children: 3
- Awards: American Society for Photobiology 2002; Faculty Member of the Year 2012 Faculty of 1000; Advanced ERC grant awardee 2012
- Scientific career
- Fields: Metagenomics, Microbiology
- Doctoral advisor: Prof. Eitan Bibi
- Website: https://beja.net.technion.ac.il/

Oded Béjà (Hebrew: עודד בז'ה) is a professor in the Technion-Israel Institute of Technology, in the field of marine microbiology and metagenomics.

== Academic work ==
Oded Béjà is best known for discovering the first bacterial rhodopsin naming it proteorhodopsin, during his postdoctoral fellowship in the laboratory of Edward DeLong. Oded Béjà's laboratory focuses currently on the role and diversity of photosynthetic viruses infecting cyanobacteria in the oceans, and the use of functional metagenomics for the discovery of new light sensing proteins.

In 2018, the team of Oded Beja discovered a new family of rhodopsins with an inverted membrane topology, which can be found in bacteria, algae, algal viruses and archaea. Members of the new family were named heliorhodopsins.

== Early life and education ==
Oded Béjà graduated with a B.Sc. degree from the Robert H. Smith Faculty of Agriculture, Food and Environment - Hebrew University of Jerusalem. He earned his M.Sc. and Ph.D. from the Weizmann Institute of Science in 1998.

== Recognition ==
- 2024 EMBO member
- Editorial board of the International Society for Microbial Ecology
- Faculty Member of the Year 2012 by Faculty of 1000.
- EMBO Young Investigator 2002-2004
- American Society for Photobiology 2002 New Investigator Award.
- Ranked 443 in the Ranking of scientists in Israel Institutions according to their Google Scholar Citations public profiles
