= Proteorhodopsin =

Family of transmembrane proteins

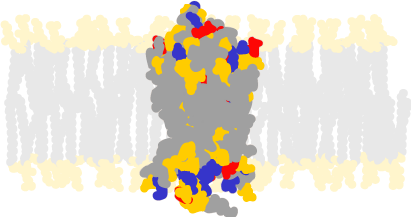
- Proteorhodopsin Cartoon Visualization

Identifiers
- Symbol: Bac_rhodopsin
- InterPro: IPR017402
- SCOP2: 2brd / SCOPe / SUPFAM
- TCDB: 3.E.1
- OPM superfamily: 6
- OPM protein: 4JQ6
Available protein structures:
- PDB: IPR017402
- AlphaFold: IPR017402

Proteorhodopsin (PR or pRhodopsin) belongs to the family of bacterial transmembrane rhodopsins (retinylidene proteins). In 1971, the first microbial transmembrane rhodopsin - Bacteriorhodopsin was discovered in archea domain by Dieter Oesterhelt and Walther Stoeckenius. Later in 2000, the first bacterial transmembrane rhodopsins was discovered by Oded Béjà and Edward DeLong. The Proteorhodopsin is widely expressed in various type of aquatic habitats. It functions as light-driven proton pumps with the help of retinal chromophore at the active site. The light-driven proton pump gives bacteria energy in the form of adenosine triphosphate (ATP).

== Discovery ==
Efforts by Oded Béjà from Edward DeLong research group in pioneering bacterial artificial chromosome metagenomics analysis led the discovery of pRhodopsin in bacteria domain. It was first detected in uncultured gammaproteobacteria ribotype group SAR86 at Monterey Bay water column in 2000. Oded Béjà observed the sequence similarity between SAR86 pRhodopsin and bacteriorodopsin (a light driven proton pump in haloarchea) open reading frame. To further established pRhodopsin function as retinal-based light-driven proton pump, he expressed pRhodopsin open reading frame in Escherichia coli system. Before the discovery of bacterial Proteorhodpsin, it was understood that light driven active transport only evolved in extreme halophilic archaea domain (bacteriorodopsin, halorhodopsin, and sensory rhodopsin) and animal kingdom (as a visual rhodopsin).

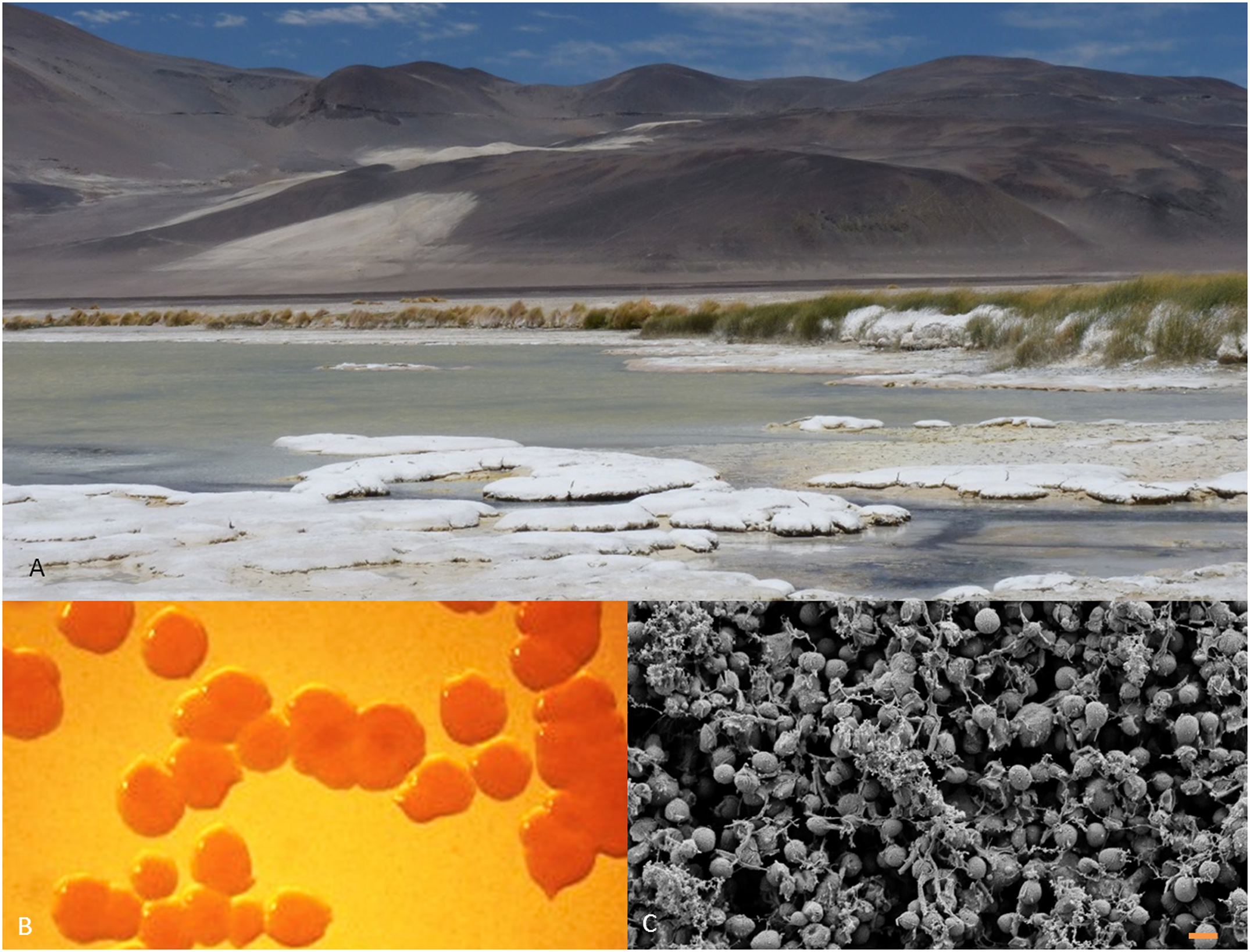
Proteorhodopsin containing Exiguobacterium sp. S17 at Laguna Socompa

== Species distribution ==
pRhodopsin is not confined to a single species and single habitat. It is distributed in many microorganisms from all over the world. pRhodopsin containing microorganisms is distributed in Gammaproteobacteria, Alphaproteobacteria, Betaproteobacteria, Flavobacteria, Planctomycetes, Cyanobacteria, Actinobacteria, marine Archaea, and different eukaryotic groups, including fungi and dinoflagellates. pRhodopsin containing microorganisms are habited in marine environments, sea ice, brackish environments, fresh water lakes and on high mountains. In the marine environment, pRhodopsin containing microorganisms is primarily found in photic zone.

== Structure ==
(a) The top view of PR. (b) The side view of PR. In (a,b), the green moiety denotes the chromophore, and the blue moiety is residue 105. (c) The structure of LYR and all hydrogens were removed for simplicity. All atom names are marked for clarity.

The topology and active site residues for proton transporting retinylidene proteins was first characterized in bacteriorhodopsin. The pRhodopsin topology and active site residues are conserved to Bacteriorhodopsin. pRhodopsin is a seven transmembrane α-helices that form a pocket in which retinal (vitamin A aldehyde) is covalently linked to ligand binding domain, as a protonated schiff base, to a lysine in the seventh transmembrane α-helix. At ground state the retinal chromophore is all-trans configuration. When visible light illuminates on pRhodopsin, the all-trans retinal molecule absorbs light energy and uses it to isomerize into13-cis configuration. This triggers a sequence of protein conformational changes including several proton transfer reactions against concentration gradient, generating a proton motive force.

== Function ==
Light-activated proteorhodopsin pumps protons outwardly, increasing the proton motive force. Protons can then reenter the cells through ATP-synthase complex, powering the ATP production.

Light-activated proteorhodopsin pumps protons outwardly, increasing the proton motive force across the microbial cell membrane. Protons can then reenter the cell through the ATP synthase complex, powering the synthesis of ATP. Proteorhodopsin thus allows microbial cells to harvest light energy and convert it into usable chemical energy without the involvement of chlorophyll-based photosystems.

Microbes containing proteorhodopsin are considered phototrophs due to its functionality as a light-sensitive proton pump. Different variants of proteorhodopsin are spectrally tuned to absorb specific wavelengths of light, such as green or blue. These adaptations allow organisms to occupy distinct ecological niches based on light availability at different water column depths. These functional advantages make proteorhodopsin a key component in the marine microbial energy budget.

== Genetic engineering ==
If the gene for proteorhodopsin is inserted into E. coli and retinal is given to these modified bacteria, then they will incorporate the pigment into their cell membrane and will pump H+ in the presence of light energy. This functionality can be used to acidify a vesicle type organelle.

== See also ==
- Bacteriorhodopsin
- Rhodopsin

== Gallery ==
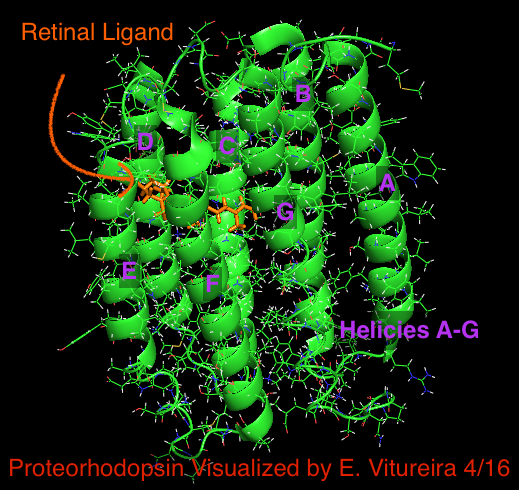
Holoenzyme (Green) with helices A-G labeled (purple) as well as Retinal ligand (orange)

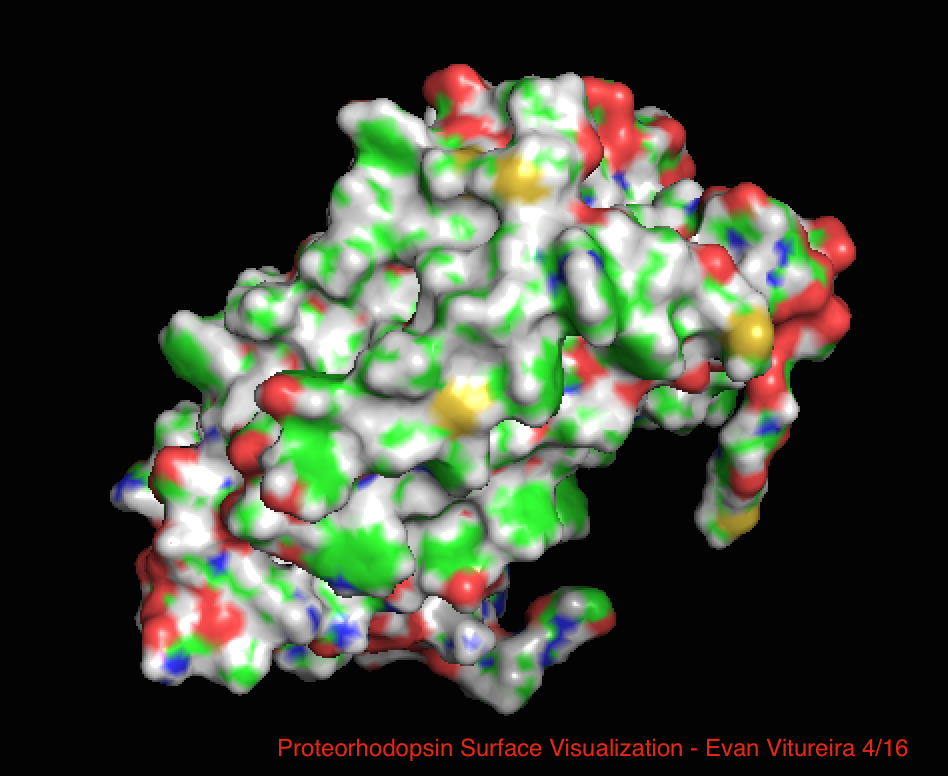
Surface visualization of Proteorhodopsin showing terminals

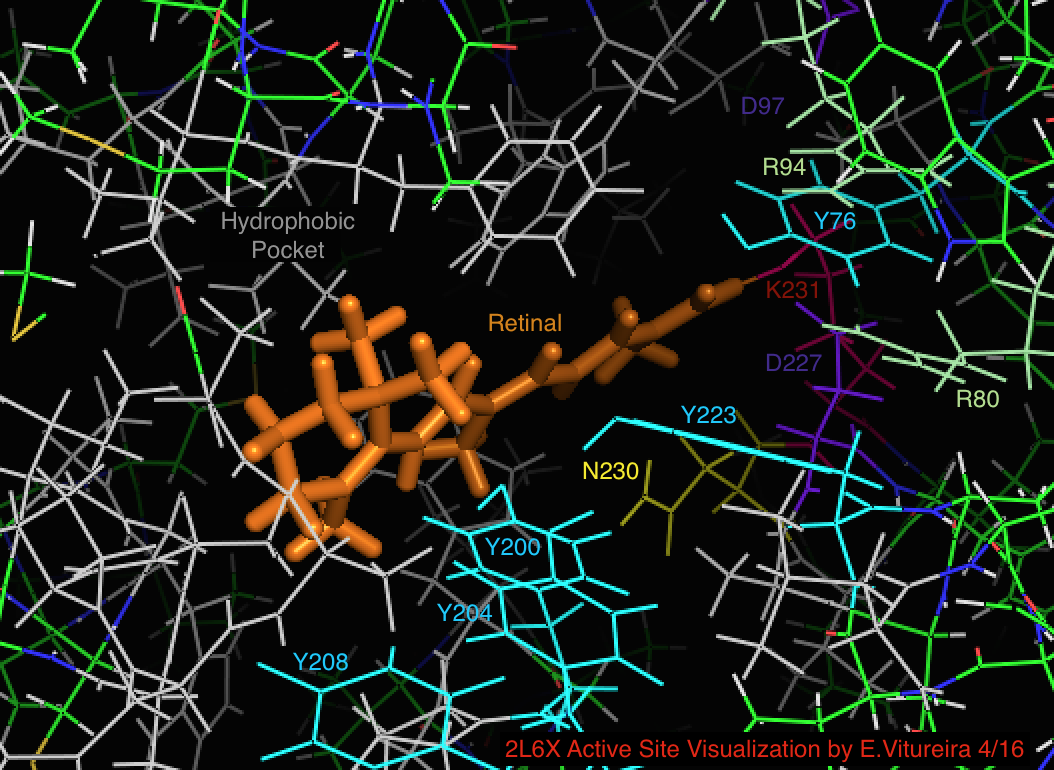
Visualization of the retinal bound active site of the 2L6X protein structure of pRhodopsin, residues color coded and labeled by activity, ligand is orange.

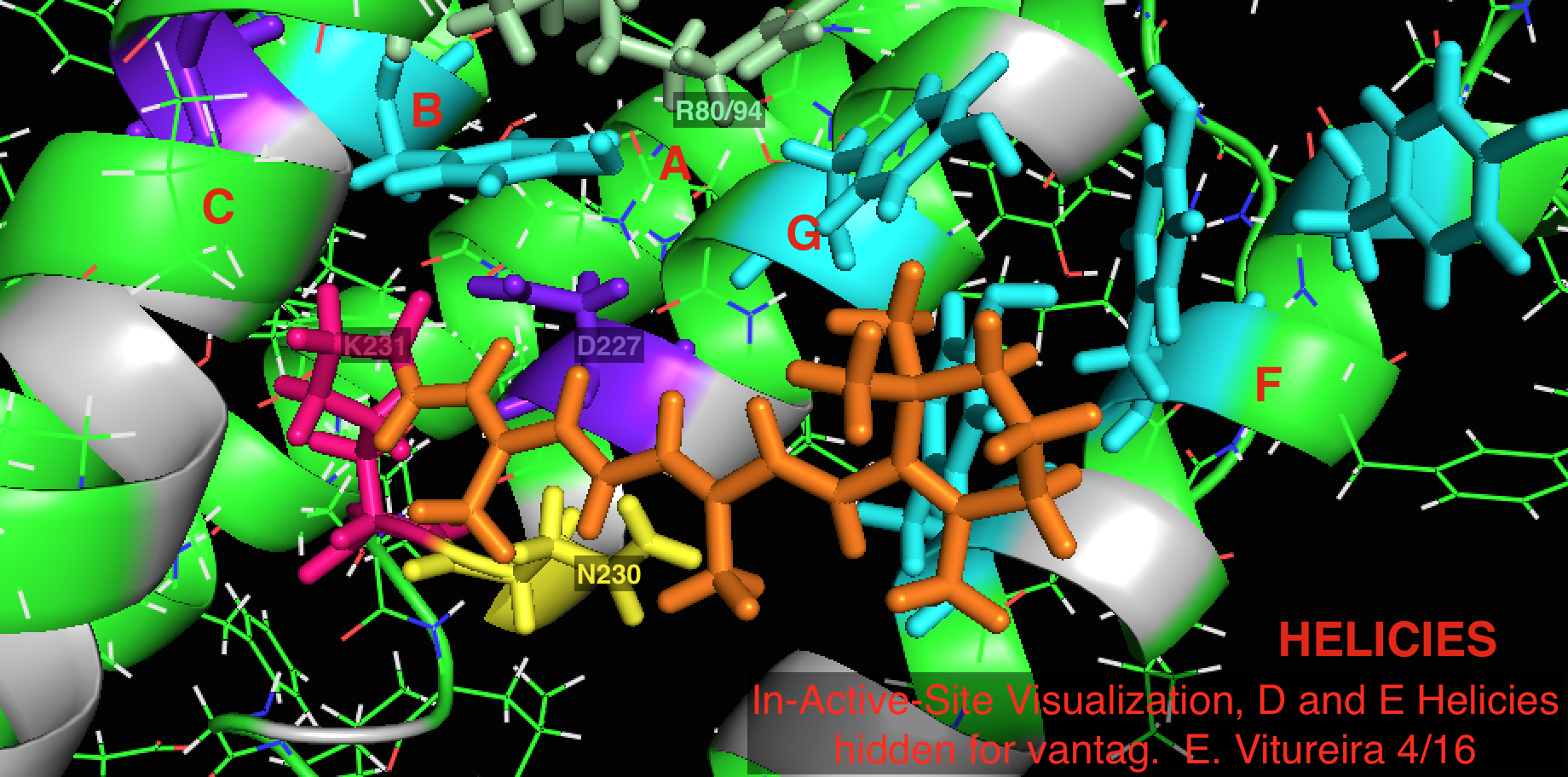
2L6x In-Active-Site Cartoon Color Coded and Labeled Visualization, D and E Helices hidden for vantage, Retinal ligand binding site
