= Heliorhodopsin =

Family of rhodopsins

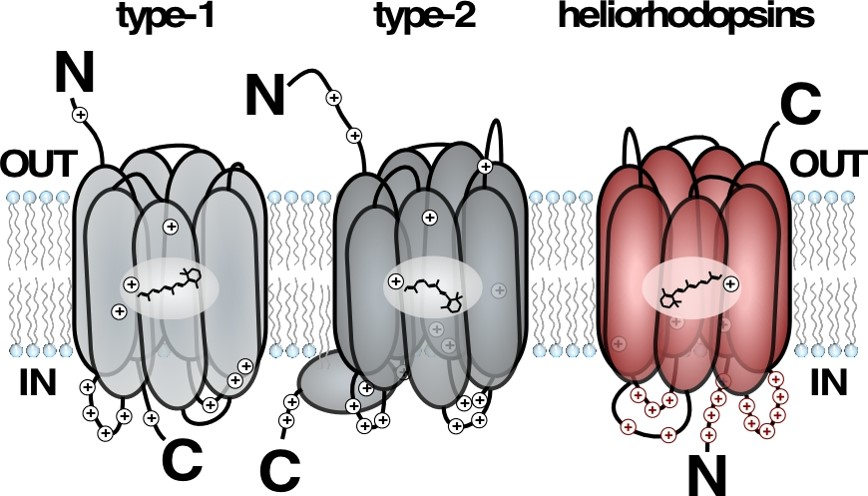
Heliorhodopsin compared with Type 1 and Type 2 rhodopsins. Before the discovery of the Heliorhodopsin, all know rhodopsins were known to have the N terminus outside the cell membrane. The plus signs represent positively charged amino acids.

Heliorhodopsin is a family of rhodopsins discovered in 2018 by Alina Pushkarev in the laboratory of Professor Oded Beja. The new family of heliorhodopsins has a distinct protein sequence from known Type 1 (microbial) and Type 2 (animal) rhodopsins. Heliorhodopsins also exhibit the reverse orientation in the membrane compared with the other rhodopsins, with the N-terminus facing the inside of the cell and the C-terminus outside the cell.

Heliorhodopsins use all-trans retinal as a chromophore, and do not have any ion pumping activity across the membrane. Heliorhodopsins are distributed globally and exist in eukaryotes, prokaryotes and even some viruses. Despite the wide distribution, Heliorhodopsins are never present in true gram-negative bacteria, where there is a proper double membrane around the microorganism. It has been suggested that the function of Heliorhodopsin requires a direct interaction with the environment.

Crystal structure of a monomer of heliorhodopsin from Thermoplasmatales archaeon SG8-52-1, based on .

Crystal structures of Heliorhodopsins suggest they form a homodimer, contain a fenestration leading toward the retinal molecule and have a large extracellular loop facing the outside of the cell.
