= Archaerhodopsin =

Family of archaea

Archaerhodopsin proteins are a family of retinal-containing photoreceptors found in the archaea genera Halobacterium and Halorubrum. Like the homologous bacteriorhodopsin (bR) protein, archaerhodopsins harvest energy from sunlight to pump H^{+} ions out of the cell, establishing a proton motive force that is used for ATP synthesis. They have some structural similarities to the mammalian G protein-coupled receptor protein rhodopsin, but are not true homologs.

Archaerhodopsins differ from bR in that the claret membrane, in which they are expressed, includes bacterioruberin, a second chromophore thought to protect against photobleaching. Also, bR lacks the omega loop structure observed at the N-terminus of the structures of several archaerhodopsins.

Mutants of Archaerhodopsin-3 (AR3) are used as tools in optogenetics for neuroscience research.

Trimeric complex of archaerhodopsin-2 (PDB: 2EI4). The two gray planes indicate the hydrocarbon boundaries of the lipid bilayer and were calculated with the ANVIL algorithm.

== Etymology ==
The term archaerhodopsin is a portmanteau of archaea (the domain in which the proteins are found) and rhodopsin (a photoreceptor responsible for vision in the mammalian eye).

archaea from Ancient Greek ἀρχαῖα (arkhaîa, "ancient"), the plural and neuter form of ἀρχαῖος (arkhaîos, "ancient").
rhodopsin from Ancient Greek ῥόδον (rhódon, "rose"), because of its pinkish color, and ὄψις (ópsis, "sight").

== History ==
In the 1960s, a light driven proton pump was discovered in Halobacterium salinarum, and called Bacteriorhodopsin. Over the following years, there were various studies of the membrane of H. salinarum to determine the mechanism of these light-driven proton pumps.

In 1988, another Manabu Yoshida's group at Osaka University reported a novel light-sensitive proton pump from a strain of Halobacterium which they termed Archaerhodopsin. A year later, the same group reported isolating the gene that encodes Archaerhodopsin.

== Family members ==
Seven members of the archaerhodopsin family have been identified to date.

Name	Abbr.	Organism	GenBank	UniProt	PDB	Ref.
Archaerhodopsin-1	AR1	Halobacterium sp. Aus-1	J05165	P69052	1UAZ	
Archaerhodopsin-2	AR2	Halobacterium sp. Aus-2	S56354	P29563	3WQJ	
Archaerhodopsin-3	AR3 or Arch	Halorubrum sodomense	GU045593	P96787	6S6C	
Archaerhodopsin-4	AR4	Halobacterium sp. xz515	AF306937			
Archaerhodopsin-BD1	AR-BD1 or HxAR	Halorubrum xinjiangense	AY510709	Q6R5N7		
Archaerhodopsin-He	HeAr	Halorubrum ejinorense	LC073751			
Archaerhodopsin-TP009	AR-TP009	Halorubrum sp. TP009				

=== AR1 and AR2 ===
Archaerhodopsin 1 and 2 (AR1 and AR2) were the first archaerhodopsins to be identified and are expressed by Halobacterium sp. Aus-1 and Aus-2 respectively. Both species were first isolated in Western Australia in the late 1980s. The crystal structures of both proteins were solved by Kunio Ihara, Tsutomo Kouyama and co-workers at Nagoya University, together with collaborators at the Spring-8 synchrotron.

=== AR3/Arch ===
AR3 is expressed by Halorubrum sodomense. The organism was first identified in the Dead Sea in 1980 and requires a higher concentration of Mg^{2+} ions for growth than related halophiles. The aop3 gene was cloned by Ihara and colleagues at Nagoya University in 1999 and the protein was found to share 59% sequence identity with bacteriorhodopsin. The crystal structure of AR3 was solved by Anthony Watts at Oxford University and Isabel Moraes at the National Physical Laboratory, together with collaborators at Diamond Light Source.

Mutants of Archaerhodopsin-3 (AR3) are widely used as tools in optogenetics for neuroscience research.

AR3 has recently been introduced as a fluorescent voltage sensor.

=== AR4 ===
AR4 is expressed in Halobacterium species xz 515. The organism was first identified in a salt lake in Tibet. The gene encoding it was identified by H. Wang and colleagues in 2000. In most bacteriorhodopsin homologs, H^{+} release to the extracellular medium takes place before a replacement ion is taken up from the cytosolic side of the membrane. Under the acidic conditions found in the organism's native habitat, the order of these stages in the AR4 photocycle is reversed.

=== AR-BD1 ===
AR-BD1 (also known as HxAR) is expressed by Halorubrum xinjiangense. The organism was first isolated from Xiao-Er-Kule Lake in Xinjiang, China.

=== HeAr ===
HeAR is expressed by Halorubrum ejinorense. The organism was first isolated from Lake Ejinor in Inner Mongolia, China.

=== AR-TP009/ArchT ===
AR-TP009 is expressed by Halorubrum sp. TP009. Its ability to act as a neural silencer has been investigated in mouse cortical pyramidal neurons.

== General features ==
Bacterioruberin

=== Occurrence ===
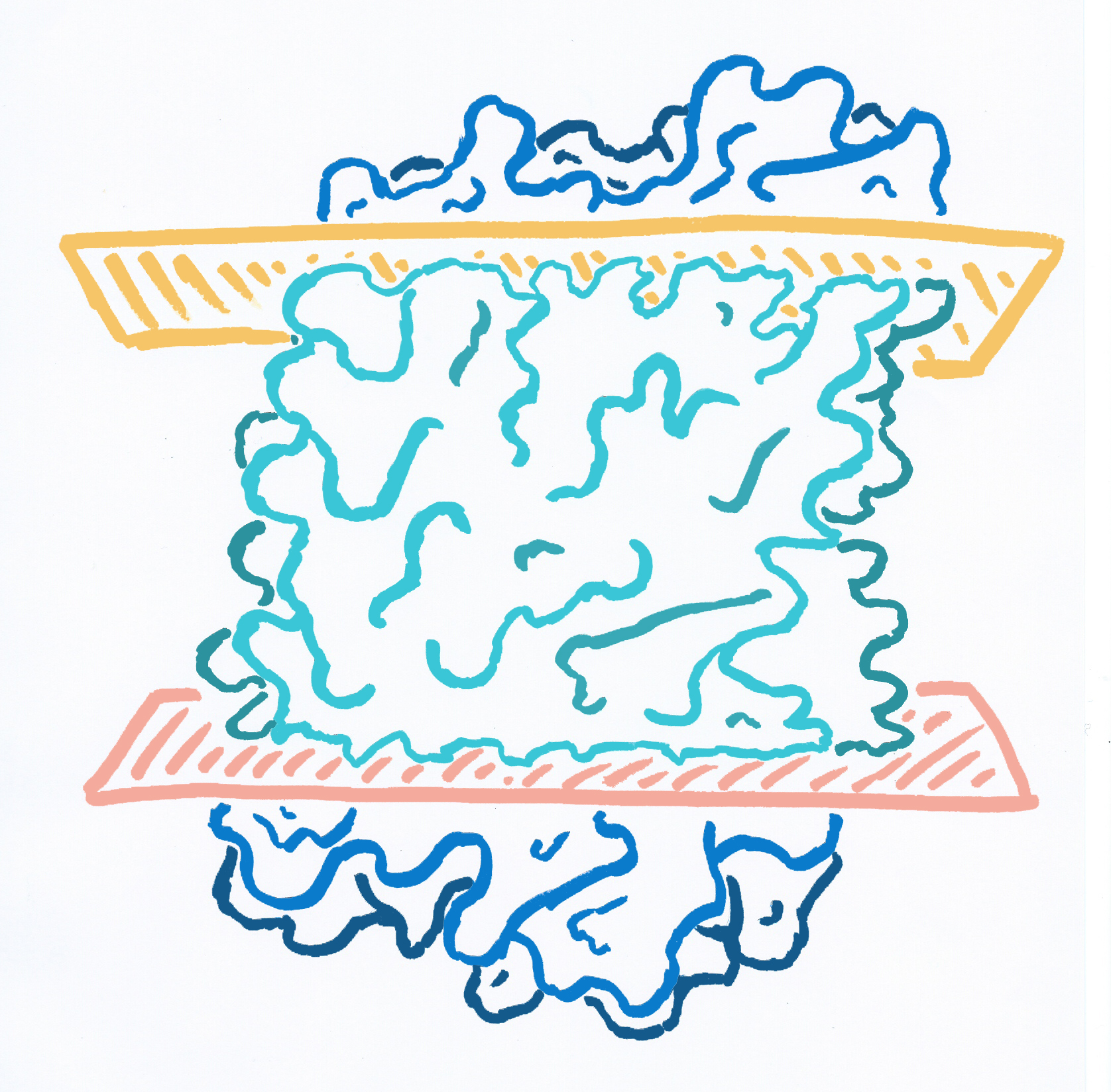
Archaerhodopsin surface model

Like other members of the microbial rhodopsin family, archaerhodopsins are expressed in specialised, protein-rich domains of the cell surface membrane, commonly called the claret membrane. In addition to ether lipids, the claret membrane contains bacterioruberin, (a 50-carbon carotenoid pigment) which is thought to protect against photobleaching. Atomic force microscope images of the claret membranes of several archaerhodopsins, show that the proteins are trimeric and are arranged in a hexagonal lattice. Bacterioruberin has also been implicated in oligomerisation and may facilitate protein-protein interactions in the native membrane.

=== Function ===
Archaerhodopsins are active transporters, using the energy from sunlight to pump H^{+} ions out of the cell to generate a proton motive force that is used for ATP synthesis. Removal of the retinal cofactor (e.g. by treatment with hydroxylamine) abolishes the transporter function and dramatically alters the absorption spectra of the proteins. The proton pumping ability of AR3 has been demonstrated in recombinant E. coli cells and of AR4 in liposomes.

In the resting or ground state of archaerhodopsin, the bound retinal is in the all-trans form, but on absorption of a photon of light, it isomerizes to 13-cis. The protein surrounding the chromophore reacts to the change of shape and undergoes an ordered sequence of conformational changes, which are collectively known as the photocycle. These changes alter the polarity of the local environment surrounding titratable amino acid side chains inside the protein, enabling H^{+} to be pumped from the cytoplasm to the extracellular side of the membrane. The intermediate states of the photocycle may be identified by their absorption maxima.

=== Structures ===
Ground or resting state structure of Archaerhodopsin-3 PDB:6S6C

Crystal structures of the resting or ground states of AR1 (3.4 Å resolution), AR2 (1.8 Å resolution) and AR3 (1.07 and 1.3 Å) have been deposited in the Protein Data Bank. Proteins possess seven transmembrane α-helices and a two-stranded extracellular-facing β-sheet. Retinal is covalently bonded via Schiff base to a lysine residue on helix G. (Note: Helix G is the nearest transmembrane helix to the C-terminus.) The conserved DLLxDGR sequence, close to the extracellular-facing N-terminus of both proteins, forms a tightly curved omega loop that has been implicated in bacterioruberin binding. The cleavage of the first 6 amino acids and the conversion of Gln7 to a pyroglutamate (PCA) residue was also observed in AR3, as previously reported for bacteriorhodopsin.

== Use in research ==
Archaerhodopsins drive the hyperpolarization of the cell membrane by secreting protons in presence of light, thereby inhibiting action potential firing of neurons. This process is associated with an increase in extracellular H+ (i.e. decreased pH linked to the activity of these proteins. These characteristics allow for Archaerhodopsins to be commonly used tools for optogenetic studies as they behave as transmission inhibition factors in presence of light. When expressed within intracellular membranes, the proton pump activity increases the cytosolic pH, this functionality can be used for optogenetic acidification of lysosomes and synaptic vesicles when targeted to these organelles.
