= Shiladitya DasSarma =

Indian-American biologist (born 1957)

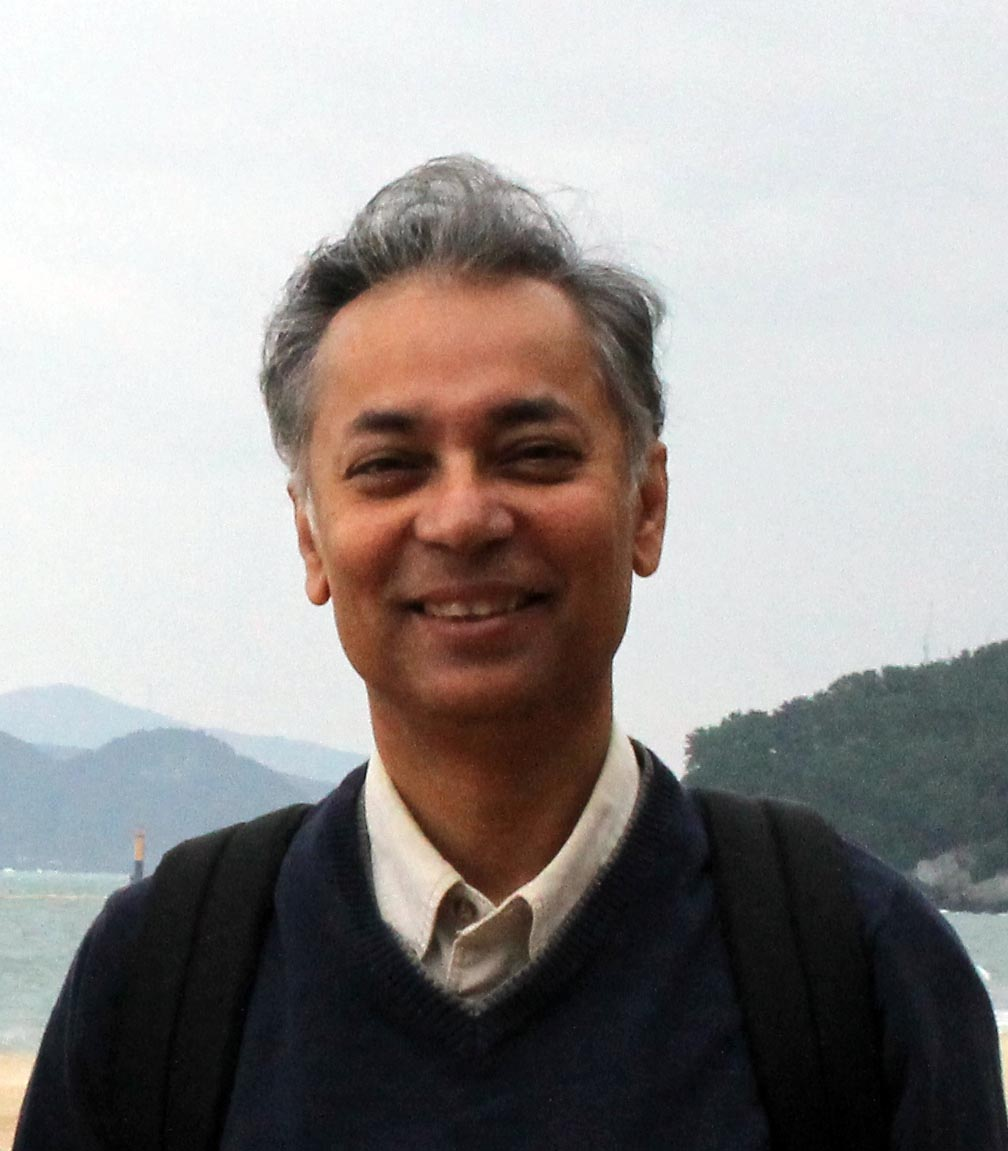
- DasSarma in 2016
- Born: November 11, 1957 (age 68); Kolkata, India
- Education: Indiana University (BS); Massachusetts Institute of Technology (PhD)
- Occupation: Professor
- Employer: University of Maryland Baltimore
- Known for: Haloarchaea, Climate Action
- Awards: Margaret MacVicar Award

Shiladitya DasSarma (born November 11, 1957) is an Indian-American molecular biologist well-known for contributions to the biology of halophilic and extremophilic microorganisms. He is a Professor in the University of Maryland Baltimore. He earned a PhD degree in biochemistry from the Massachusetts Institute of Technology and a BS degree in chemistry from Indiana University Bloomington. Prior to taking a faculty position, he conducted research at the Massachusetts General Hospital, Harvard Medical School, and Pasteur Institute, Paris.

DasSarma has served on the faculty of the University of Massachusetts Amherst (1986-2001), University of Maryland Biotechnology Institute (2001-2010), and University of Maryland School of Medicine, Institute of Marine and Environmental Technology (2010–present). He is a researcher and teacher of molecular genetics, genomics, and bioinformatics and mentor of undergraduate, graduate and postdoctoral students, and junior faculty. He is widely known to have been instrumental in the foundation of the fields of halophile and extremophile research.

== Research ==
=== Halophiles ===
In early work (1980's), he discovered mobile genetic elements in halophilic Archaea, while a graduate student with H. Gobind Khorana (Nobel laureate) and Uttam L. RajBhandary at MIT. He also showed that transcriptional promoters in Archaea were different from those in common Bacteria, which contributed to the acceptance of the three Domain view of evolution proposed by Carl Woese.

In the 1990s, he organized and led the team that deciphered the first genome sequence and genetic code for a halophilic microbe, Halobacterium sp. NRC-1. This work showed that its proteins are highly acidic, providing an understanding of how proteins may function in high salinity and low water activity conditions. The genome sequence helped to further establish the validity of the Archaea through the finding of similarities to higher eukaryotic organisms and differences from Bacteria.

Later in the 2000s, his work also suggested that certain genes are acquired through horizontal gene transfers, such as the genes for aerobic respiration. Post-genomic research in his laboratory established the core and signature proteins in halophilic Archaea, and the function of many genes and genetic elements, including multiple replication origins, general transcription factors, and DNA repair systems.

=== Astrobiology ===
DasSarma's recent research (2010's) on an Antarctic halophilic microorganism, Halorubrum lacusprofundi, resulted in further refinement in understanding of protein function in a combination of high salinity and cold conditions. Such studies may explain how life could adapt to new environments, including extraterrestrial environments.

DasSarma proposed that retinal pigments originally discovered in halophilic Archaea may have predated chlorophyll pigments in the early earth, named the "Purple Earth" hypothesis. The proposal provides a potential new biosignature for remote detection of life.

=== Biotechnology ===
DasSarma's laboratory has been instrumental in the study of buoyant gas vesicle nanoparticles (GVNPs) in Halobacterium sp. NRC-1, and developed an expression system to bioengineer GVNPs for biotechnology applications. These nanoparticles may represent a valuable platform for antigen delivery, vaccine development, and other biomedical and environmental applications.
