= Heme A =

Chemical compound

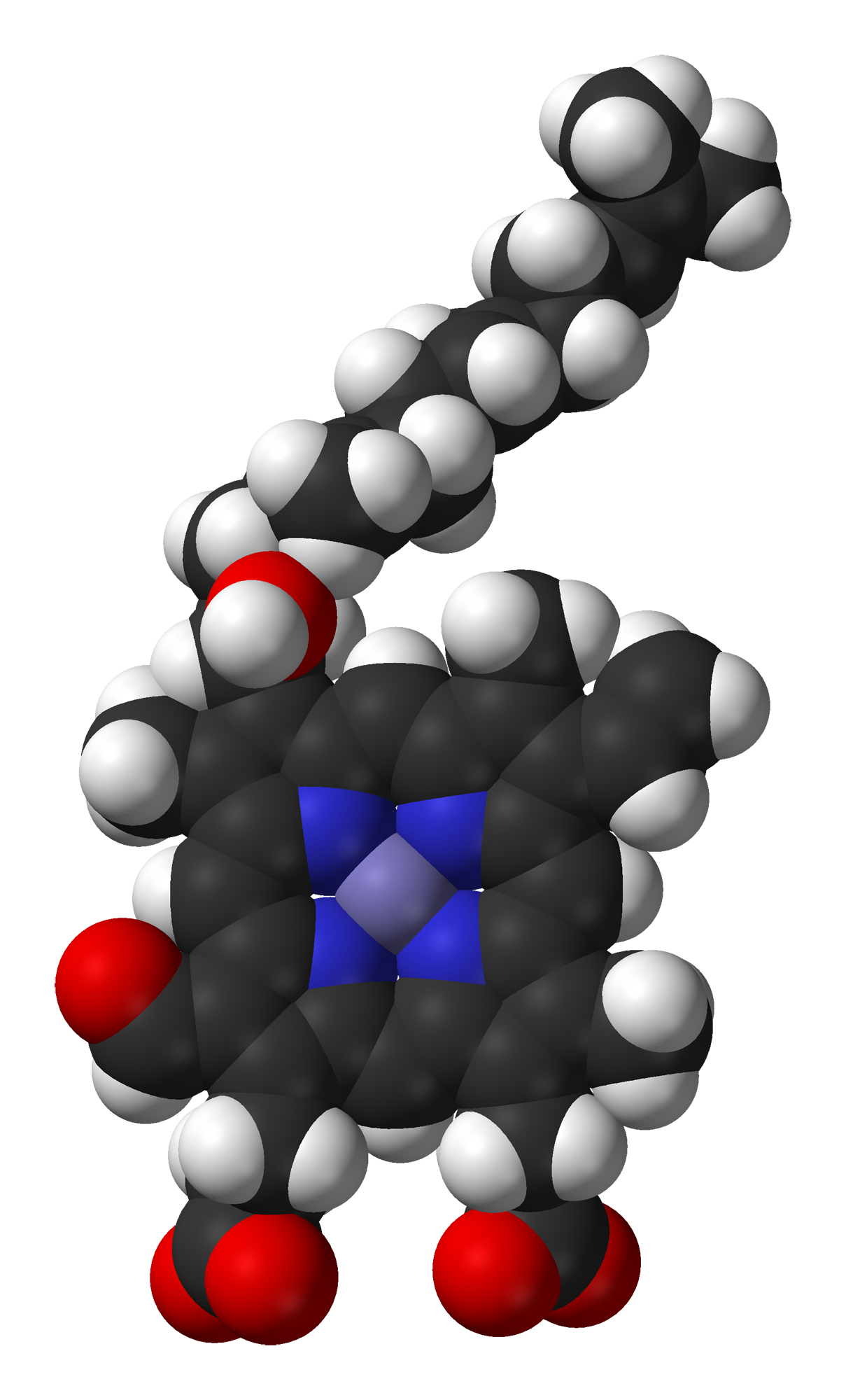

Names
- IUPAC name Iron(II) 3-[18-(2-carboxyethyl)-7-ethenyl-17-formyl-12-[(1S,4E,8E)-1-hydroxy-5,9,13-trimethyltetradeca-4,8,12-trienyl]-3,8,13-trimethylporphyrin-22,24-diid-2-yl]propanoic acid
- Other names Iron cytoporphyrin IX, formilporphyrin

Identifiers
CAS Number	18535-39-2
3D model (JSmol)	Interactive image
ChemSpider	21106444
MeSH	Heme+a
PubChem CID	5288529
CompTox Dashboard (EPA)	DTXSID50897568
- InChI: InChI=1S/C49H59N4O6.Fe/c1-9-34-31(6)39-25-45-49(46(55)18-12-17-30(5)16-11-15-29(4)14-10-13-28(2)3)33(8)40(52-45)24-44-37(27-54)36(20-22-48(58)59)43(53-44)26-42-35(19-21-47(56)57)32(7)38(51-42)23-41(34)50-39;/h9,13,15,17,23-27,43,46,55H,1,10-12,14,16,18-22H2,2-8H3,(H4-,50,51,52,53,56,57,58,59);/q-1;+2/p-2/b29-15+,30-17+,42-26-; Key: RRRJRRNGYOECDS-ZHOBENDVSA-L; InChI=1/C49H59N4O6.Fe/c1-9-34-31(6)39-25-45-49(46(55)18-12-17-30(5)16-11-15-29(4)14-10-13-28(2)3)33(8)40(52-45)24-44-37(27-54)36(20-22-48(58)59)43(53-44)26-42-35(19-21-47(56)57)32(7)38(51-42)23-41(34)50-39;/h9,13,15,17,23-27,43,46,55H,1,10-12,14,16,18-22H2,2-8H3,(H4-,50,51,52,53,56,57,58,59);/q-1;+2/p-2/b29-15+,30-17+,42-26-;/rC49H57FeN4O6/c1-9-34-31(6)39-25-45-49(46(56)18-12-17-30(5)16-11-15-29(4)14-10-13-28(2)3)33(8)40-24-44-37(27-55)36(20-22-48(59)60)43-26-42-35(19-21-47(57)58)32(7)38-23-41(34)51(39)50(52(38)42,53(40)45)54(43)44/h9,13,15,17,23-27,43,46,56H,1,10-12,14,16,18-22H2,2-8H3,(H,57,58)(H,59,60)/q-1/b29-15+,30-17+ Key: RRRJRRNGYOECDS-DRKRPJRXBB
- SMILES: OC(=O)CC/c6c(\C)c3n7c6cc2c(/CCC(O)=O)c(/C=O)c1cc5n8c(cc4n([Fe]78n12)c(c=3)c(C=C)c4c)c(\C(O)CC\C=C(/C)CC\C=C(/C)CC\C=C(C)/C)c5\C

Properties
Chemical formula	C_{49}H_{56}O_{6}N_{4}Fe
Molar mass	852.837
- Except where otherwise noted, data are given for materials in their standard state (at 25 °C [77 °F], 100 kPa). verify (what is ?) Infobox references

Heme A (or haem A) is a heme, a coordination complex consisting of a macrocyclic ligand called a porphyrin, chelating an iron atom. Heme A is a biomolecule and is produced naturally by many organisms. Heme A, often appears a dichroic green/red when in solution, is a structural relative of heme B, a component of hemoglobin, the red pigment in blood.

== Relationship to other hemes ==
Heme A differs from heme B in that a methyl side chain at ring position 8 is oxidized to a formyl group and a hydroxyethylfarnesyl group, an isoprenoid chain, has been attached to the vinyl side chain at ring position 2 of the iron tetrapyrrole heme. Heme A is similar to heme o, in that both have this farnesyl addition at position 2 but heme O does not have the formyl group at position 8, still containing the methyl group. The correct structure of heme A, based upon NMR and IR experiments of the reduced, Fe(II) form of the heme, was published in 1975. The structure was confirmed by synthesis of the dimethyl ester of the iron-free form.

== History ==
Heme A was first isolated by the German biochemist Otto Warburg in 1951 and shown by him to be the active component of the integral membrane metalloprotein cytochrome c oxidase.

== Stereochemistry ==
The final structural question of the exact geometric configuration about the first carbon at ring position 3 of ring I, the carbon bound to the hydroxyl group, has been shown to be the chiral S configuration.

Like heme B, heme A is often attached to the apoprotein through a coordinate bond between the heme iron and a conserved amino acid side-chain. In the important respiratory protein cytochrome c oxidase (CCO) this ligand 5 for the heme A at the oxygen reaction center is a histidyl group. Histidine is a common ligand for many hemeproteins including hemoglobin and myoglobin.

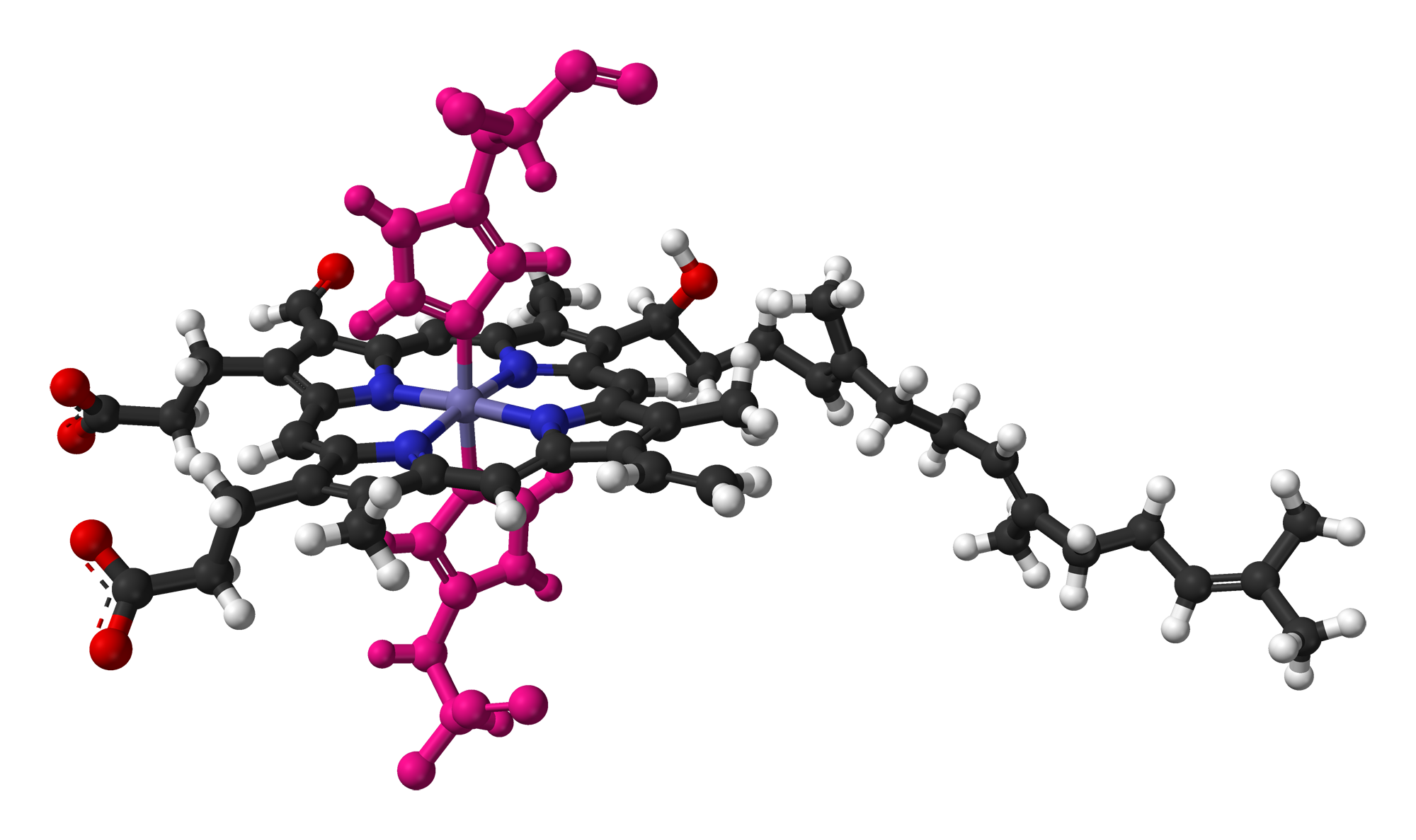

Heme A in the cytochrome a portion of cytochrome c oxidase, bound by two histidine residues (shown in pink)

An example of a metalloprotein that contains heme A is cytochrome c oxidase. This very complicated protein contains heme A at two different sites, each with a different function. The iron of the heme A of cytochrome a is hexacoordinated, that is bound with 6 other atoms. The iron of the heme A of cytochrome a3 is sometimes bound by 5 other atoms leaving the sixth site available to bind dioxygen (molecular oxygen). In addition, this enzyme binds 3 copper, magnesium, zinc, and several potassium and sodium ions. The two heme A groups in CCO are thought to readily exchange electrons between each other, the copper ions and the closely associated protein cytochrome c.

Both the formyl group and the isoprenoid side chain are thought to play important roles in conservation of the energy of oxygen reduction by cytochrome c oxidase. CCO is thought to be responsible for conserving the energy of dioxygen reduction by pumping protons into the inter-membrane mitochondrial space. Both the formyl and hydroxyethylfarnesyl groups of heme A are thought to play important roles in this critical process, as published by the influential group of S. Yoshikawa.

== See also ==
- Heme
- Hemoprotein
- Cytochrome c oxidase (Complex IV of cellular respiration)
