= Edward DeLong =

American microbiologist (born 1958)

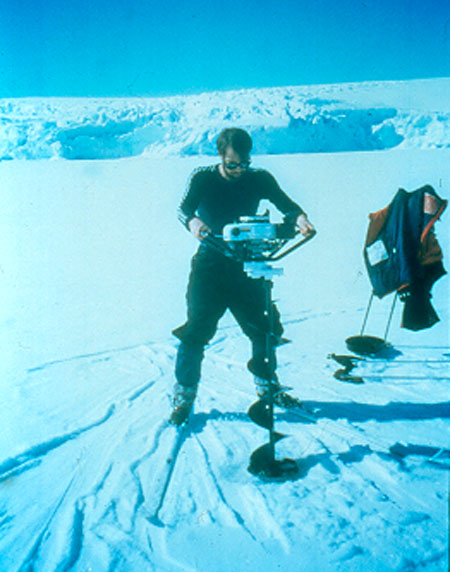
- DeLong performing fieldwork in Antarctica
- Born: 1958 (age 67–68); Sonoma, California, U.S.
- Education: Santa Rosa Junior College; University of California, Davis; Scripps Institution of Oceanography
- Known for: Work in metagenomics and biogeochemical cycling
- Scientific career
- Fields: Microbiology
- Workplaces: Massachusetts Institute of Technology; Monterey Bay Aquarium Research Institute; University of Hawaiʻi at Mānoa
- Doctoral advisor: Art Yayanos; Norman Pace (postdoc)

Edward Francis DeLong (born 1958), is a marine microbiologist and Professor Emeritus in the School of Ocean and Earth Science and Technology at the University of Hawaii, Manoa, and is considered a pioneer in the field of metagenomics. He is best known for his discovery of the bacterial use of the rhodopsin protein in converting sunlight to biochemical energy in marine microbial communities.

== Early life and education ==
DeLong was born in Sonoma, California. He studied biology at Santa Rosa Junior College and obtained an Associate of Science degree in 1980. While continuing his education at the University of California, Davis, DeLong had originally planned on becoming a medical technologist, but after a meeting and working as an undergraduate researcher with bacteriologist Paul Baumann, he found a new interest in marine microbiology. He graduated with a Bachelor of Science degree in bacteriology at UCD in 1982 and moved to the Scripps Institution of Oceanography, where he received a Ph.D. in marine biology after finishing doctoral work with biophysicist Art Yayanos in 1986. DeLong completed his postdoctoral training at Indiana University in Bloomington with Norman Pace, where he surveyed communities of picoplankton via DNA sequencing.

== Work ==
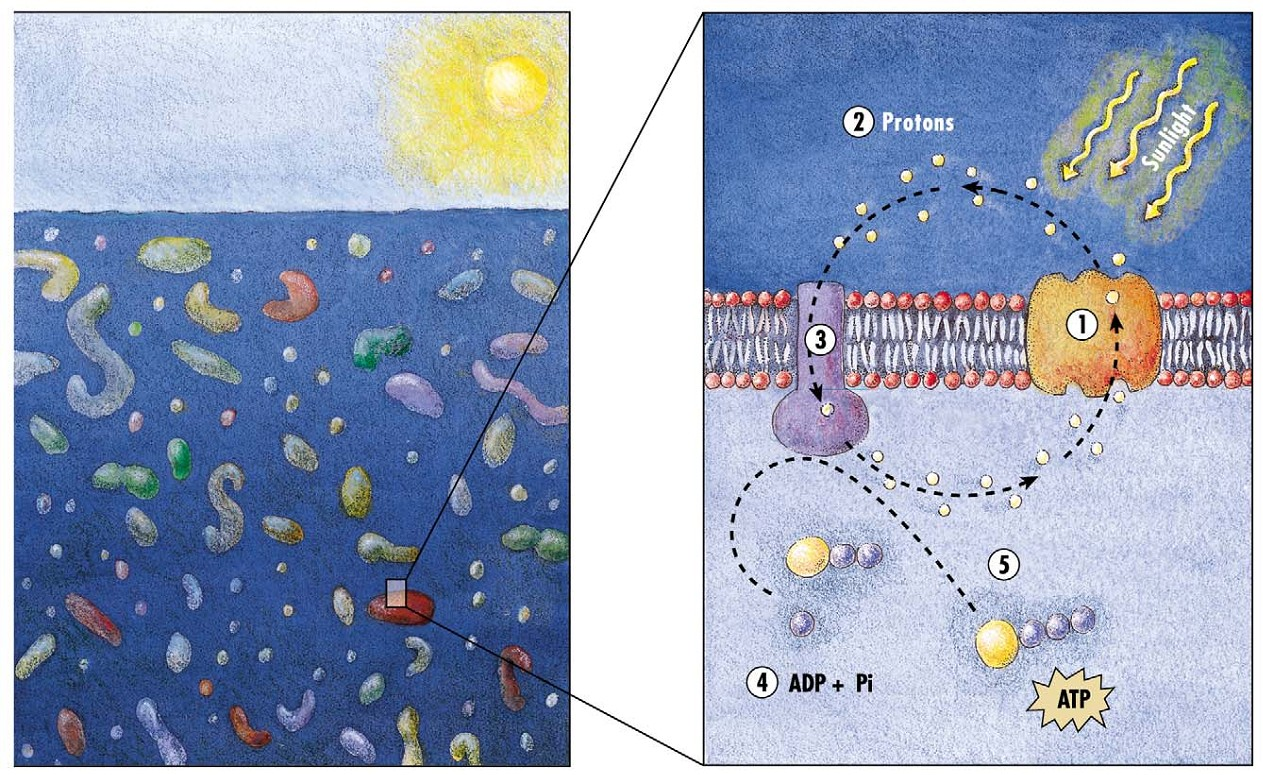
Energy gathering mechanism in marine bacteria via Proteorhodopsin.

With Pace and his group at Indiana University, DeLong developed a method that can be used to identify single cells phylogenetically through the use of phylogenetic stains. These rRNA-based probes identify the cells based on the binding of fluorescent probes to individual cells through use of oligonucleotides that are complementary to 16S rRNA sequences of specific phylogenetic groups. The use of multiple probes with different fluorescent dyes allows for the identification of different cell types in the same field.

DeLong subsequently expanded upon this work and applied gene cloning and sequencing to the study of complex marine microbial communities and their role in the biosphere. These techniques carried significance in that microbes could be studied without the use of a standard microbial culture.

After receiving an independent study award in 1989, DeLong spent some time at the Woods Hole Oceanographic Institute in Woods Hole, Massachusetts, and would later on become associate professor in the Biology and Ecology, Evolution, and Marine Biology Departments at the University of California, Santa Barbara. DeLong's surveys during his time at UCSB led him to participate in the study of widespread abundance and diversity of marine archaea in the world's oceans. Prior to 1992, archaea were thought only to exist in the extreme environments of hypersaline lakes, hydrothermal vents, and similar places. This helped change the general view of the scientific community on the habitats and roles of archaea in the biosphere, and opened up new possibilities in applied potential of such microbial assemblages.

In the years following, DeLong's work took him to the Monterey Bay Aquarium Research Institute and it is during his time there that he made a crucial discovery in the understanding of the Earth's carbon and energy cycles. A team of microbiologists led by DeLong discovered a gene in several species of bacteria responsible for production of the protein rhodopsin, previously unheard of in the domain Bacteria. These proteins found in the cell membranes are capable of converting light energy to biochemical energy due to a change in configuration of the rhodopsin molecule as sunlight strikes it, causing the pumping of a proton from inside out and a subsequent inflow that generates the energy. While at the Monterey Bay Aquarium Research Institute, DeLong and his group also made some seminal discoveries about the Archaea and Bacteria involved in the then mysterious process of anoxic oxidation of methane within marine sediments.

In 2004, DeLong moved to the Massachusetts Institute of Technology, where he worked on further developing functional metagenomic surveys, as well as gene expression studies targeting microbial communities in the wild. At MIT, his collaborations with CMORE and Monterey Bay Aquarium Research Institute colleagues, he discovered of highly synchronized microbial populations having diurnal, coordinated patterns of gene oscillating expression across many species and in different habitats. In 2014, DeLong relocated to the University of Hawaii, where he served as co-director for the Center for Microbial Oceanography: Research and Education, C-MORE and the Simons Collaboration on Ocean Processes and Ecology, SCOPE. From 2016 - 2022, DeLong also served as the Vice President, President, and Past President of the International Society for Microbial Ecology (ISME).

== Honoraria, fellowships, and memberships ==
- Honorary Professorship, University of Queensland, Brisbane, Australia, 1999–2002
- Elected Fellow in the American Academy of Microbiology, August 2000
- Moore Investigator in Marine Microbiology, August, 2004
- Elected Fellow in the American Academy of Arts and Sciences, May 2005
- In April 2008, DeLong was presented with the Vladimir Ivanovich Vernadsky Medal for "important contributions to geomicrobiology and biogeochemical cycling through the innovative use of molecular tools and a genomic approach" at the European Geosciences Union
- Elected Fellow in the National Academy of Sciences, April 2008
- The American Society for Microbiology presented DeLong with the Procter & Gamble Award in Applied and Environmental Microbiology in May 2008 and the D.C. White Research and Mentoring Award in February 2009
- Elected Fellow in the American Association for the Advancement of Science, 2011
- UC Davis College of Biological Sciences Outstanding Alumni Award, UC Davis, 2012
- Moore Investigator in Marine Microbiology, 2012
- A.G. Huntsman Award for Excellence in the Marine Sciences, 2014
- Elected Member in the European Molecular Biology Association EMBO, 2015
- Elected President of the International Society for Microbial Ecology (ISME)

== See also ==
- Thermoproteota
- Proteorhodopsin
