= Heme O =

Names
- IUPAC name Iron(II) 3-[18-(2-carboxyethyl)-7-ethenyl-12-[(4E,8E)-1-hydroxy-5,9,13-trimethyltetradeca-4,8,12-trienyl]-3,8,13,17-tetramethylporphyrin-21,23-diid-2-yl]propanoic acid

Identifiers
CAS Number	137397-56-9
3D model (JSmol)	Interactive image
ChemSpider	3571849
MeSH	heme+O
PubChem CID	15719509
- InChI: InChI=1S/C49H60N4O5.Fe/c1-10-35-31(6)40-26-45-49(46(54)19-13-18-30(5)17-12-16-29(4)15-11-14-28(2)3)34(9)41(53-45)24-38-32(7)36(20-22-47(55)56)43(51-38)27-44-37(21-23-48(57)58)33(8)39(52-44)25-42(35)50-40;/h10,14,16,18,24-27,46,54H,1,11-13,15,17,19-23H2,2-9H3,(H4,50,51,52,53,55,56,57,58);/q;+2/p-2/b29-16+,30-18+,38-24-,39-25-,40-26-,41-24-,42-25-,43-27-,44-27-,45-26-; Key: FISPASSVCDRERW-KVGORYHISA-L
- SMILES: OC(=O)CC/c6c(\C)c3n7c6cc2c(/CCC(O)=O)c(/C)c1cc5n8c(cc4n([Fe]78n12)c(c=3)c(C=C)c4c)c(\C(O)CC\C=C(/C)CC\C=C(/C)CC\C=C(C)/C)c5\C

Properties
Chemical formula	C_{49}H_{58}O_{5}N_{4}Fe
Molar mass	838.854 g/mol
- Except where otherwise noted, data are given for materials in their standard state (at 25 °C [77 °F], 100 kPa). verify (what is ?) Infobox references

Heme O (or haem O) differs from the closely related heme A by having a methyl group at ring position 8 instead of the formyl group. The isoprenoid chain at position 2 is the same.

Heme O, found in the bacterium Escherichia coli, functions in a similar manner to heme A in mammalian oxygen reduction.

== See also ==
- Heme
