= Sensory rhodopsin II =

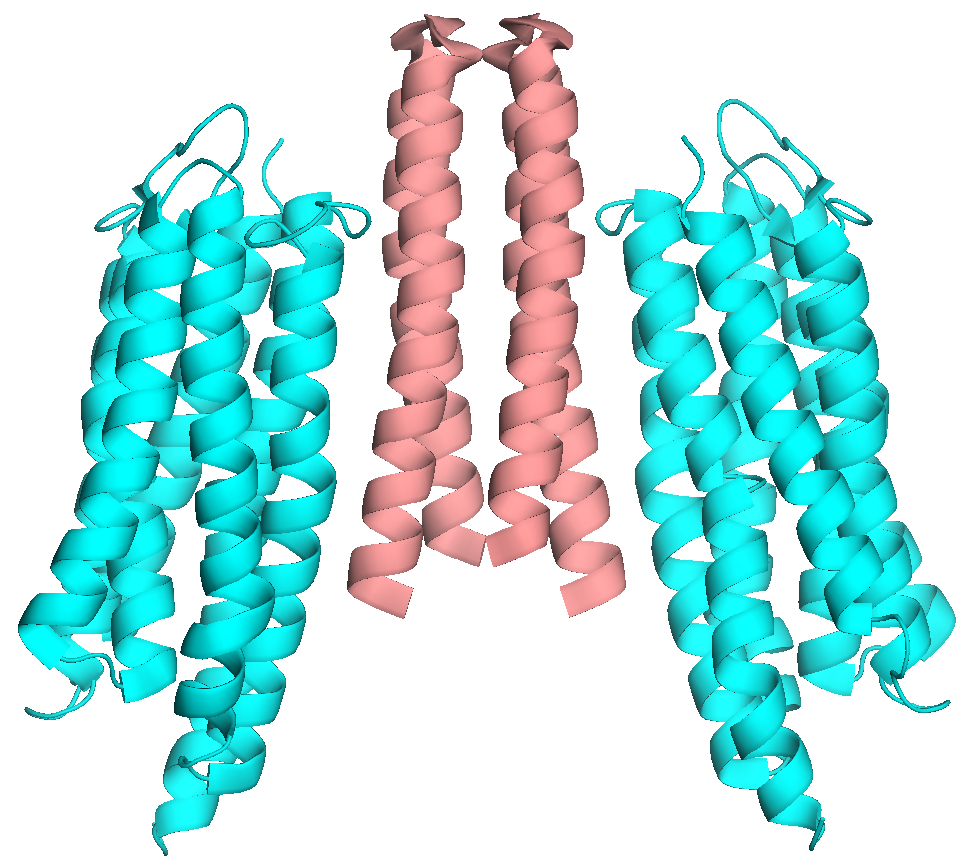
Crystal structure of NpSRII-HtrII complex dimer. SRII is in blue. View is along the membrane, extracellular space is on the top. Only transmembrane helices of HtrII are resolved.

Sensory rhodopsin II (SRII), also known as pharaonis phoborhodopsin (ppR), is a membrane protein of archaea, responsible generating the phototaxis signal. Sensory rhodopsin II is found in Halobacterium salinarum and Natronomonas pharaonis.

== Structure ==
Structure of sensory rhodopsin II is typical for microbial rhodopsin. It consists of seven transmembrane α-helices with retinal molecule connected via Schiff base to K205. Notable feature of sensory rhodopsin II is presence of charged residue Y199 on the surface of the hydrophobic region. This residue is responsible for binding of sensory rhodopsin II transducer protein - HtrII. HtrII consists of two transmembrane helices, two HAMP-domains and methyl-accepting signalling domain. In case of Halobacterium salinarum HtrII also comprises extracellular chemosensor region, which is responsible for serine sensing.

== Function ==
SRII in the plasma membrane binds its transducer via a number of bonds. Photon absorption induces structural changes in SRII, which when conducted to HtrII. HtrII in turn regulates level of unbound kinases in cytoplasm. Kinases regulate rotation of flagella via phosphorylation. Thus phototaxis signal is converted in bacteria' motion.
