= FAM136A =

Protein-coding gene in the species Homo sapiens

Identifiers
- Aliases: FAM136A, family with sequence similarity 136 member A
- External IDs: OMIM: 616275; MGI: 1913738; GeneCards: FAM136A

Gene location (Human)
Chr.	Chromosome 2 (human)
Band	2p13.3	Start	70,295,975 bp
Band	2p13.3	End	70,302,090 bp

Gene location (Mouse)
Chr.	Chromosome 6 (mouse)
Band	6|6 D1	Start	86,342,628 bp
Band	6|6 D1	End	86,347,040 bp
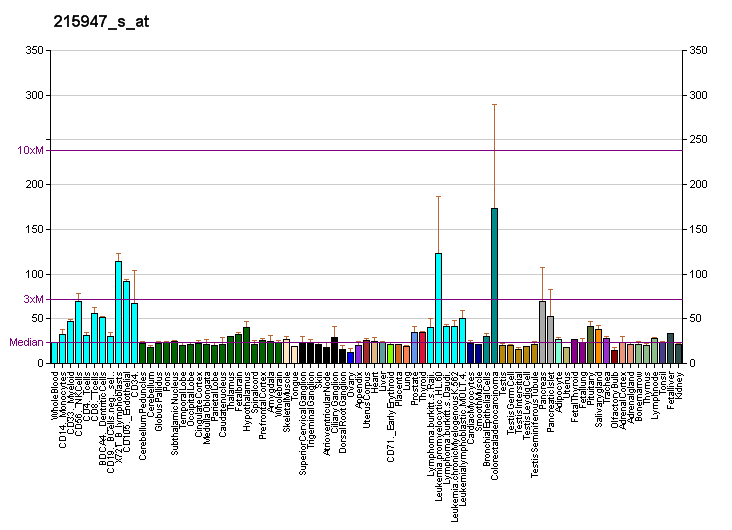
RNA expression pattern
Bgee	Human / Mouse (ortholog); Top expressed in: parotid gland; body of pancreas; gingival epithelium; rectum; mucosa of transverse colon; epithelium of nasopharynx; hair follicle; duodenum; right lobe of liver; pancreatic epithelial cell / Top expressed in: primitive streak; embryo; abdominal wall; epiblast; embryo; endocardial cushion; yolk sac; somite; migratory enteric neural crest cell; cumulus cell; More reference expression data
BioGPS	More reference expression data
Orthologs
Databases	NCBI: entry; OMA: entry
Species	Human	Mouse
Entrez	84908	66488
Ensembl	ENSG00000035141	ENSMUSG00000057497
UniProt	Q96C01	Q9CR98
RefSeq (mRNA)	NM_001329752; NM_001329753; NM_001329755; NM_001329757; NM_001329758 NM_032822	NM_025591; NM_001368363
RefSeq (protein)	NP_001316681; NP_001316682; NP_001316684; NP_001316686; NP_001316687 NP_116211	NP_079867; NP_001355292
Location (UCSC)	Chr 2: 70.3 – 70.3 Mb	Chr 6: 86.34 – 86.35 Mb
PubMed search
- Wikidata
View/Edit Human	View/Edit Mouse

Protein FAM136A is a protein that in humans is encoded by the FAM136A gene

== Clinical significance ==
Mutations in FAM136A are associated to Ménière's disease.
