= Beja, Kapurthala =

Beja
- Village
- Country: India
- State: Punjab
- District: Kapurthala

Government
  - Type: Panchayati raj (India)
  - Body: Gram panchayat

Population (2011)
  - Total: 162
- Sex ratio 81/81♂/♀

Languages
  - Official: Punjabi
  - Other spoken: Hindi
- Time zone: UTC+5:30 (IST)
- PIN: 144601
- Telephone code: 01822
- ISO 3166 code: IN-PB
- Vehicle registration: PB-09
- Website: kapurthala.gov.in

Beja is a village in Kapurthala district of Punjab State, India. It is located 6 kilometres (3.7 mi) from Kapurthala, which is both district and sub-district headquarters of Beja. The village is administrated by a Sarpanch, who is an elected representative.

== Demography ==
According to the report published by Census India in 2011, Beja has a total number of 25 houses and population of 162 of which include 81 males and 81 females. Literacy rate of Beja is 77.86%, higher than state average of 75.84%. The population of children under the age of 6 years is 22 which is 13.58% of total population of Beja, and child sex ratio is approximately 833, lower than state average of 846.

== Population data ==
Particulars	Total	Male	Female
Total No. of Houses	25	-	-
Population	162	81	81
Child (0–6)	22	12	10
Schedule Caste	94	45	49
Schedule Tribe	0	0	0
Literacy	77.86 %	85.51 %	70.42 %
Total Workers	54	46	8
Main Worker	53	0	0
Marginal Worker	1	1	0

== Air travel connectivity ==
The closest airport to the village is Sri Guru Ram Dass Jee International Airport.
