= Bacteriorhodopsin =

Protein used by single-celled organisms

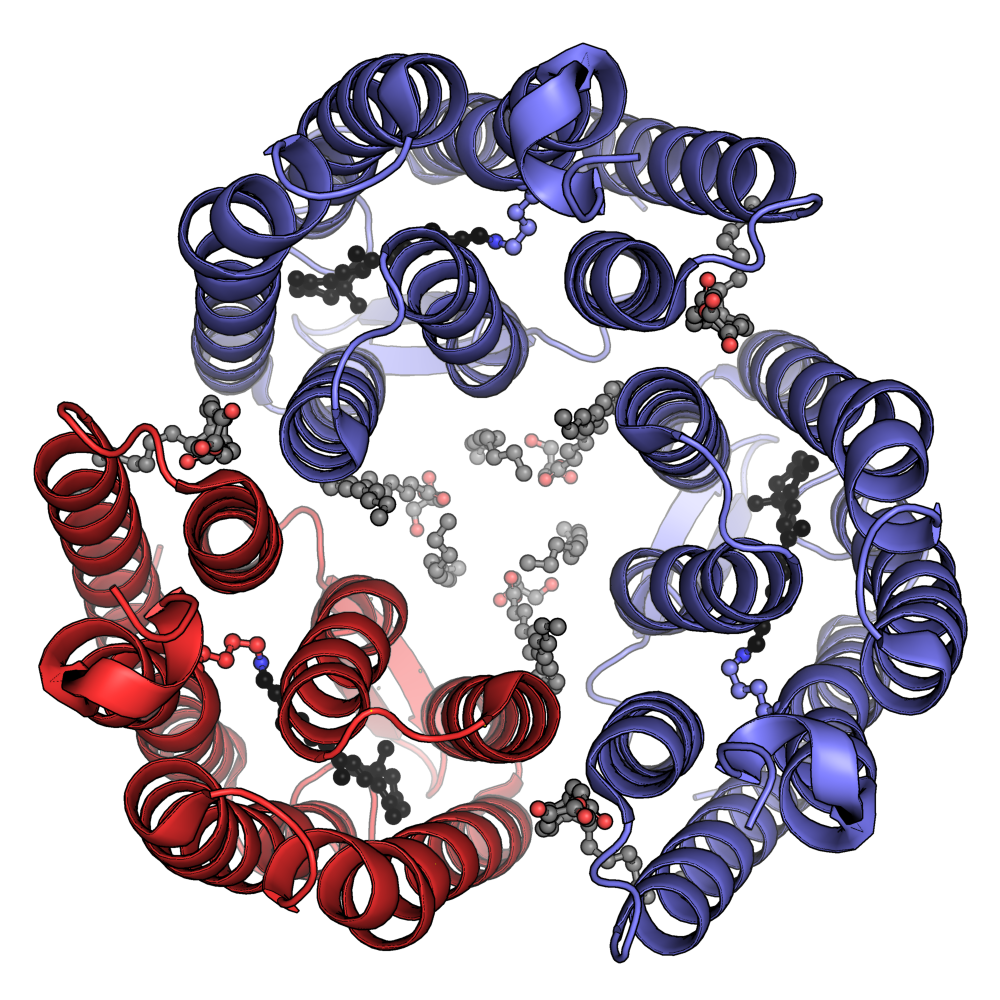
- Halobacterium salinarum bacteriorhodopsin homotrimer viewed from the cytoplasm. Bound retinal shown in black. PDB: 6RQP

Identifiers
- Organism: Halobacterium salinarum
- Symbol: bop
- Orthologs: OMA: entry
- UniProt: P02945
Search for
- Structures: Swiss-model
- Domains: InterPro

Bacteriorhodopsin (Bop) is a protein used by Archaea, most notably by Haloarchaea, a class of the Euryarchaeota. It acts as a proton pump; that is, it captures light energy and uses it to move protons across the membrane out of the cell. The resulting proton gradient is subsequently converted into chemical energy.

== Function ==
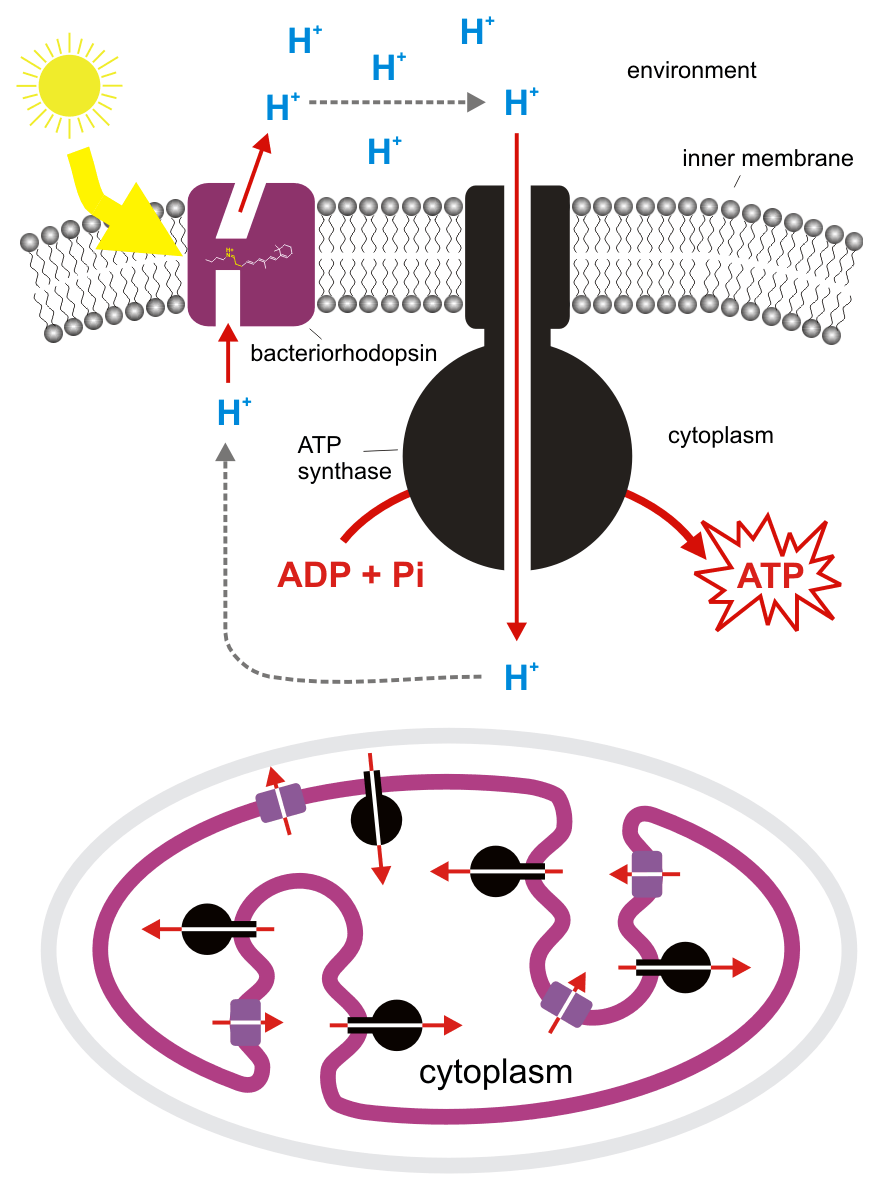
Chemiosmotic coupling between bacteriorhodopsin and ATP synthase in the Halobacterium salinarum membrane

Bacteriorhodopsin is a light-driven H^{+} ion transporter found in some Haloarchaea, most notably Halobacterium salinarum (formerly known as syn. H. halobium). The proton-motive force generated by the protein is used by ATP synthase to generate adenosine triphosphate (ATP). By expressing Bacteriorhodopsin, the archaea cells are able to synthesise ATP in the absence of a carbon source.

== Structure ==
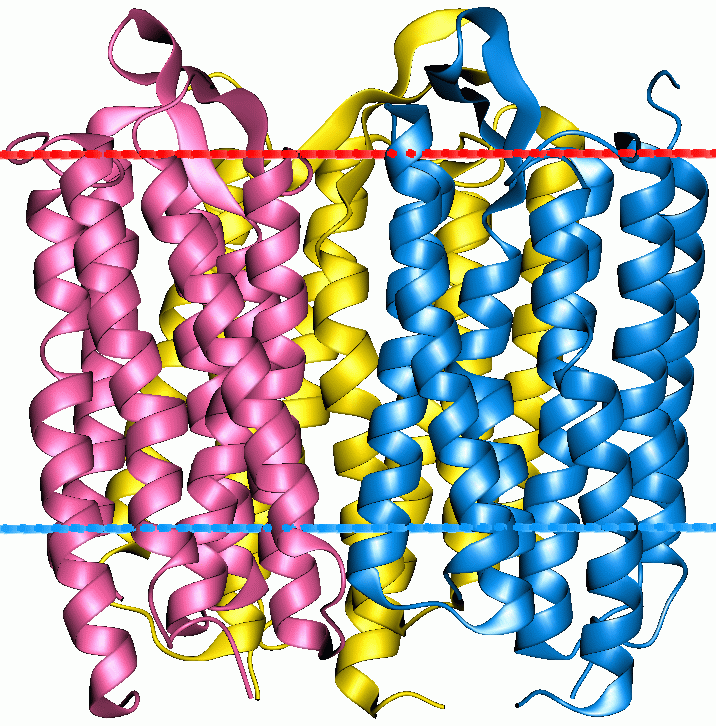
A bacteriorhodopsin trimer, showing the approximate positions of the extracellular and cytoplasmic sides of the membrane (red and blue lines respectively)

Bacteriorhodopsin is a 27 kDa integral membrane protein usually found in two-dimensional crystalline patches known as "purple membrane", which can occupy almost 50% of the surface area of the archaeal cell. The repeating element of the hexagonal lattice is composed of three identical protein chains, each rotated by 120 degrees relative to the others. Each monomer has seven transmembrane alpha helices and an extracellular-facing, two-stranded beta sheet.

Bacteriorhodopsin is synthesized as a protein precursor, known as bacterio-opsin, which is extensively modified after translation. The modifications are:

- Covalent conjugation of a retinal molecule to residue Lys216, via a Schiff base, to create the retinylidene chromophore.
- Cleavage of the signal peptide, the first 13 amino acids at the N-terminus, and the conversion of residue Gln14 to pyroglutamate
- Removal of residue Asp262 at the C-terminus

== Spectral properties ==
Bacteriorhodopsin molecule is purple and is most efficient at absorbing green light (in the wavelength range 500-650 nm). In the native membrane, the protein has a maximum absorbance at 553 nm, however addition of detergent disrupts the trimeric form, leading a loss of exciton coupling between the chromophores, and the monomeric form consequently has an absorption maximum of 568 nm.

Bacteriorhodopsin has a broad excitation spectrum. For a detection wavelength between 700 and 800 nm, it has an appreciable detected emission for excitation wavelengths between 470 nm and 650 nm (with a peak at 570 nm). When pumped at 633 nm, the emission spectrum has appreciable intensity between 650 nm and 850 nm.

== Mechanism ==
=== Photocycle overview ===
Bacteriorhodopsin is a light-driven proton pump. It is the retinal molecule that changes its isomerization state from all-trans to 13-cis when it absorbs a photon. The surrounding protein responds to the change in the chromophore shape, by undergoing an ordered sequence of conformational changes (collectively known as the photocycle). The conformational changes alter the pK_{a} values of conserved amino acids in the core of the protein, including Asp85, Asp96 and the Schiff base N atom (Lys216). These sequential changes in acid dissociation constant, result in the transfer of one proton from the intracellular side to the extracellular side of the membrane for each photon absorbed by the chromophore.

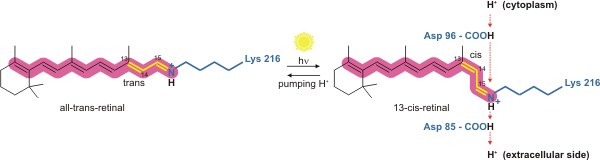

The bacteriorhodopsin photocycle consists of nine distinct stages, starting from the ground or resting state, which is denoted 'bR'. The intermediates are identified by single letters and may be distinguished by their absorption spectra. The nine stages are:

bR + photon → K ⇌ L ⇌ M_{1} ⇌ M_{2} ⇌ M_{2}' ⇌ N ⇌ N' ⇌ O ⇌ bR

=== Ground state + photon → K state → L state ===
Conformational change, paired stereogram. The orange molecule is all-trans retinal and the red molecule is 13-cis retinal.

Bacteriorhodopsin in the ground state absorbs a photon and the retinal changes isomerization from all-trans 15-anti to the strained 13-cis 15-anti in the K state. The isomerisation reaction is fast and occurs in less than 1 ps. The retinal adopts a less strained conformation to form the L intermediate.

=== L state → M_{1} state ===
Asp85 accepts a proton from the Schiff base N atom. In the M_{1} intermediate, neither the Schiff base nor Asp85 are charged.

=== M_{1} state → M_{2} state ===
The Schiff base rotates away from the extracellular side of the protein towards the cytoplasmic side, in preparation to accept a new proton.

=== M_{2} state → M_{2}' state ===
A proton is released from Glu204 and Glu194 to the extracellular medium.

=== M_{2}' state → N state ===
The retinal Schiff base accepts a proton from Asp96. In the N state, both Asp96 and the Schiff base are charged.

=== N state → N' state ===
Asp96 accepts a proton from the cytoplasmic side of the membrane and becomes uncharged.

=== N' state → O state ===
Retinal reisomerizes to the all-trans state.

=== O state → ground state ===
Asp85 transfers a proton to Glu194 and Glu204 on the extracellular face of the protein.

== Homologs and other similar proteins ==
Bacteriorhodopsin belongs to the microbial rhodopsin family. Its homologs include the archaerhodopsins, the light-driven chloride pump halorhodopsin (for which the crystal structure is also known), and some directly light-activated channels such as channelrhodopsin.

Bacteriorhodopsin is similar to vertebrate rhodopsins, the pigments that sense light in the retina. Rhodopsins also contain retinal; however, the functions of rhodopsin and bacteriorhodopsin are different, and there is limited similarity in their amino acid sequences. Both rhodopsin and bacteriorhodopsin belong to the 7TM receptor family of proteins, but rhodopsin is a G protein-coupled receptor and bacteriorhodopsin is not. In the first use of electron crystallography to obtain an atomic-level protein structure, the structure of bacteriorhodopsin was resolved in 1990. It was then used as a template to build models of G protein-coupled receptors before crystallographic structures were also available for these proteins. It has been excessively studied on both mica and glass substrates using Atomic force microscopy and Femtosecond crystallography.

All other phototrophic systems in bacteria, algae, and plants use chlorophylls or bacteriochlorophylls rather than bacteriorhodopsin. These also produce a proton gradient, but in a quite different and more indirect way involving an electron transfer chain consisting of several other proteins. Furthermore, chlorophylls are aided in capturing light energy by other pigments known as "antennas"; these are not present in bacteriorhodopsin-based systems. It is possible that phototrophy independently evolved at least twice, once in bacteria and once in archaea.

== Gallery ==
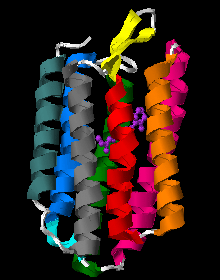
Bacteriorhodopsin single monomer with retinal molecule between 7 vertical alpha helixes (PDB ID: 1X0S). One more small helix is light blue, beta sheet yellow.

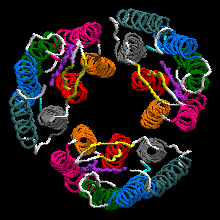
Bacteriorhodopsin trimer with one retinal molecule in each subunit seen from the extracellular side EC (PDB ID: 1X0S)

== See also ==
- Microbial rhodopsin
- Proteorhodopsin
- Opsin
- Archaerhodopsin
- Purple Earth hypothesis
