= Phototroph =

Organism using energy from light in metabolic processes

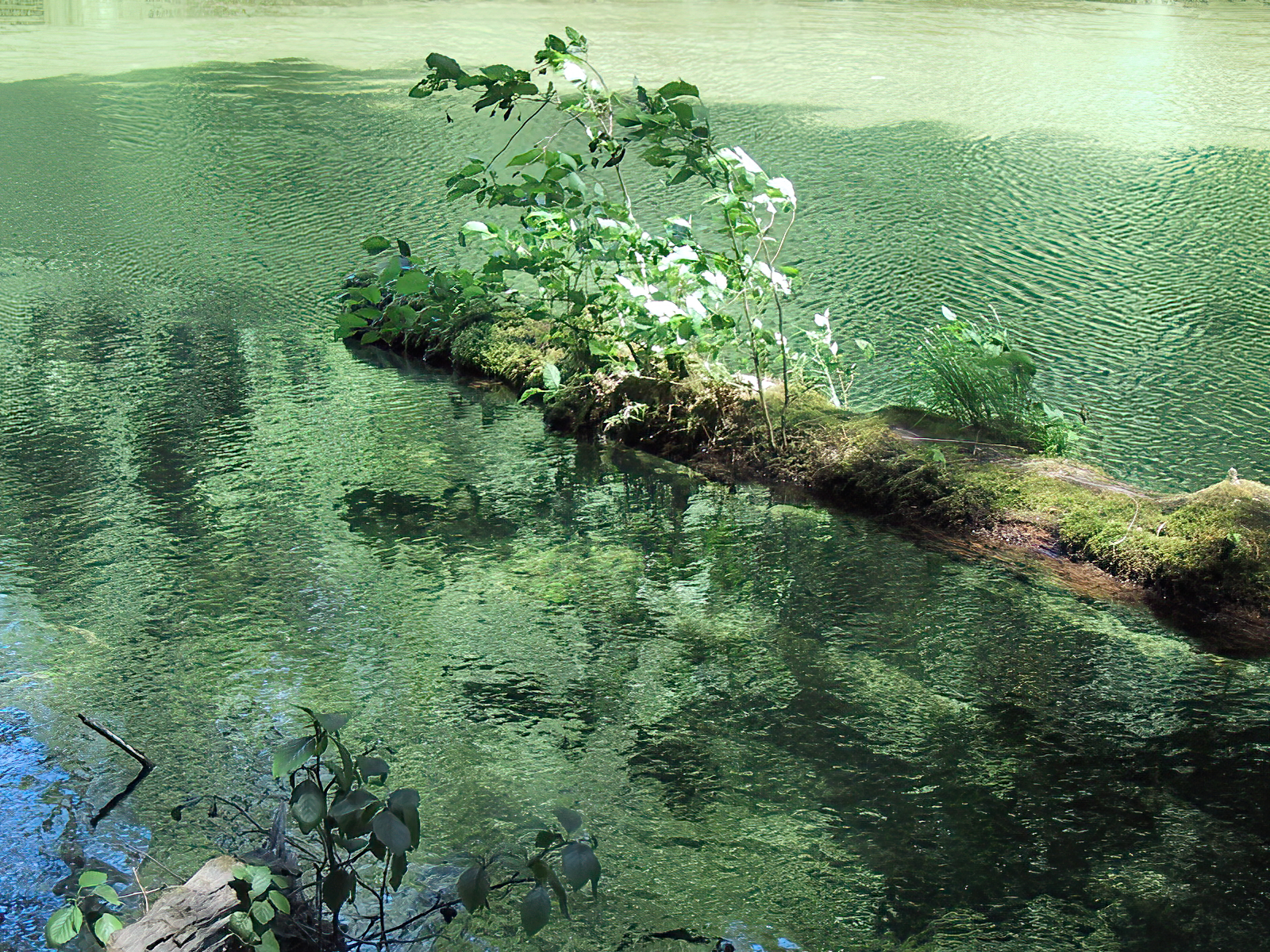
Terrestrial and aquatic phototrophs: plants grow on a fallen log floating in algae-rich water

Phototrophs (from Ancient Greek φῶς, φωτός (phôs, phōtós) 'light' and τροφή (trophḗ) 'nourishment') are organisms that carry out photon capture to acquire energy. They use the energy from light to carry out various cellular metabolic processes. It is a common misconception that phototrophs are obligatorily photosynthetic. Many, but not all, phototrophs photosynthesize: they anabolically convert carbon dioxide into biomolecules to be utilized structurally (e.g. cellulose and membrane lipids), functionally (e.g. vitamins, nucleotides, and amino acids), or as a source for later catabolic processes (e.g. starches, sugars and fats). All phototrophs either use electron transport chains or direct proton pumping to establish an electrochemical gradient, which is utilized by ATP synthase to provide adenosine triphosphate (ATP) for the cell. Phototrophs can be either autotrophs or heterotrophs. If their electron and hydrogen donors are inorganic compounds (e.g., Na_{2}S_{2}O_{3}, as in some purple sulfur bacteria, or H_{2}S, as in some green sulfur bacteria) they can be also called lithotrophs, and so, some photoautotrophs are also called photolithoautotrophs. Examples of phototroph organisms are Rhodobacter capsulatus, Chromatium, and Chlorobium.

== History ==
Originally used with a different meaning, the term took its current definition after Lwoff and collaborators (1946).

== Photoautotroph ==
Most well-known phototrophs are photoautotrophs, which means they synthesize their own food from inorganic substances (i.e. carbon dioxide) in a process called carbon fixation, using light as an energy source. Green plants and most photosynthetic bacteria are photoautotrophs. Photoautotrophic organisms are sometimes referred to as holophytic.

Oxygenic photosynthetic organisms use photosystem II to capture light-energy and oxidize water (H_{2}O), splitting it into molecular oxygen (O_{2}) and 4 protons (H^{+}) in the process called photolysis.

=== Ecology ===
In an ecological context, photoautotrophs are often the food source for neighboring heterotrophic life. In terrestrial environments, plants are the predominant variety, while aquatic environments include a range of phototrophic organisms such as algae (e.g., kelp), other protists (such as euglena), phytoplankton, and bacteria (such as cyanobacteria).

Cyanobacteria, which are prokaryotic organisms which carry out oxygenic photosynthesis, occupy many environmental conditions, including fresh water, seas, soil, and lichen. Cyanobacteria carry out plant-like photosynthesis because the organelle in plants that carries out photosynthesis is derived from an endosymbiotic cyanobacterium. This bacterium can use water as a source of electrons in order to perform CO_{2} reduction reactions.

A photolithoautotroph is an autotrophic organism that uses light energy, and an inorganic electron donor (e.g., H_{2}O, H_{2}, H_{2}S), and CO_{2} as its carbon source.

== Photoheterotroph ==
In contrast to photoautotrophs, photoheterotrophs are organisms that depend solely on light for their energy, and consumption of organic compounds for biomolecules. Photoheterotrophs produce ATP through photophosphorylation but use environmentally obtained organic compounds to build structures and other biomolecules.

== Classification by light-capturing molecule ==
Most phototrophs use chlorophyll or the related bacteriochlorophyll to capture light and are known as chlorophototrophs. Others, however, use retinal and are retinalophototrophs.

== Flowchart ==
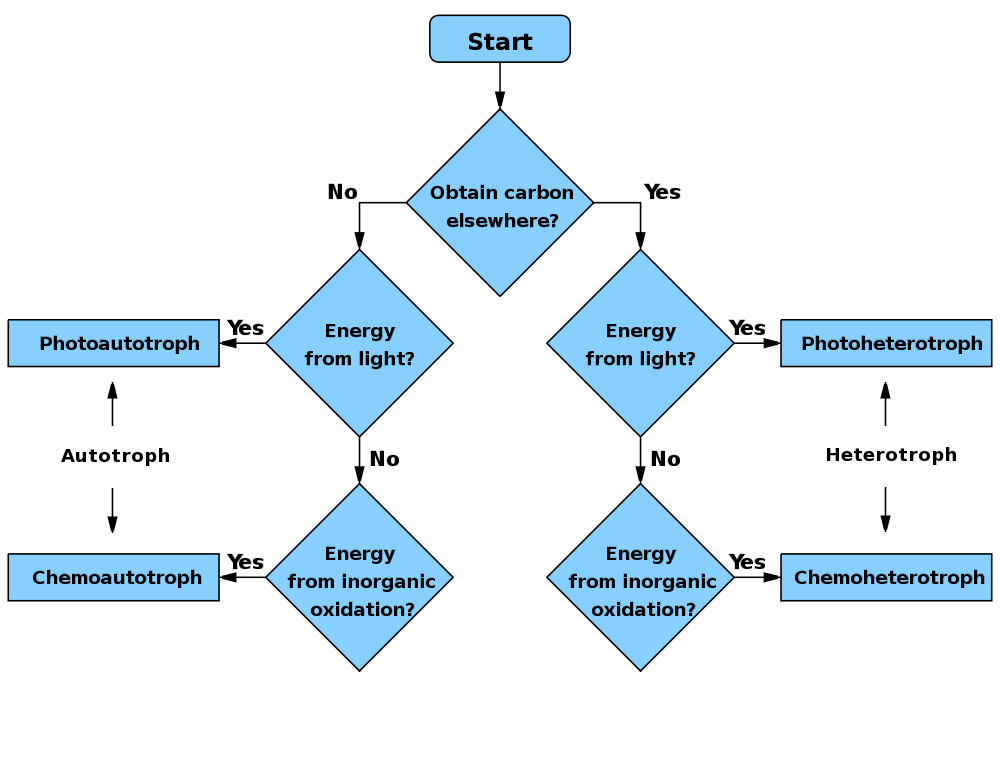
Flowchart to determine if a species is autotroph, heterotroph, or a subtype

Energy source Carbon source	From chemical energy (Chemotroph)	From light energy (Phototroph)
From CO2 (Autotroph)	Chemoautotroph	Photoautotroph
From organics (Heterotroph)	Chemoheterotroph	Photoheterotroph

== See also ==
- Primary nutritional groups
- Prototroph
