= Microbial rhodopsin =

Retinal-binding proteins

Archaeal/bacterial/fungal rhodopsins
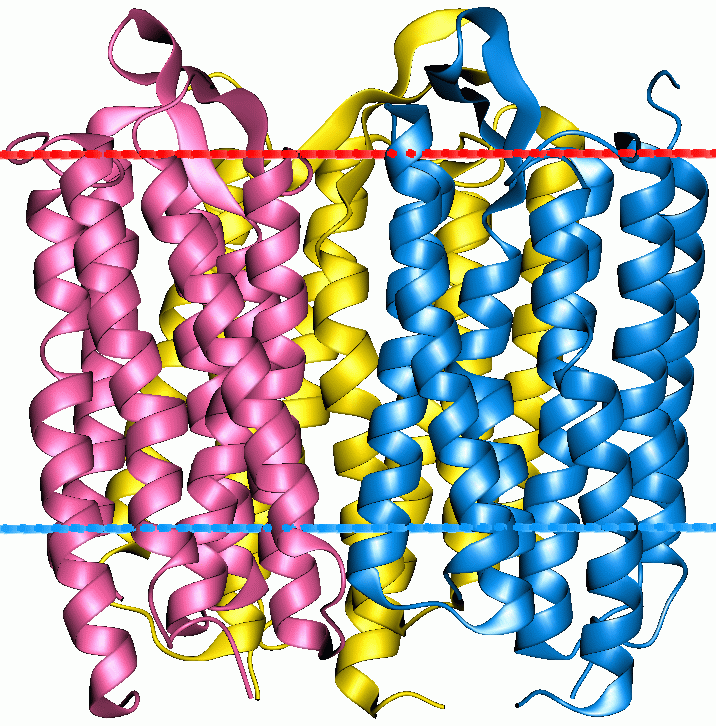
- Bacteriorhodopsin trimer

Identifiers
- Symbol: Bac_rhodopsin
- Pfam: PF01036
- InterPro: IPR001425
- SMART: SM01021
- PROSITE: PDOC00291
- SCOP2: 2brd / SCOPe / SUPFAM
- TCDB: 3.E.1
- OPM superfamily: 6
- OPM protein: 1vgo
Available protein structures:
- PDB: IPR001425 PF01036 (ECOD; PDBsum)
- AlphaFold: IPR001425; PF01036

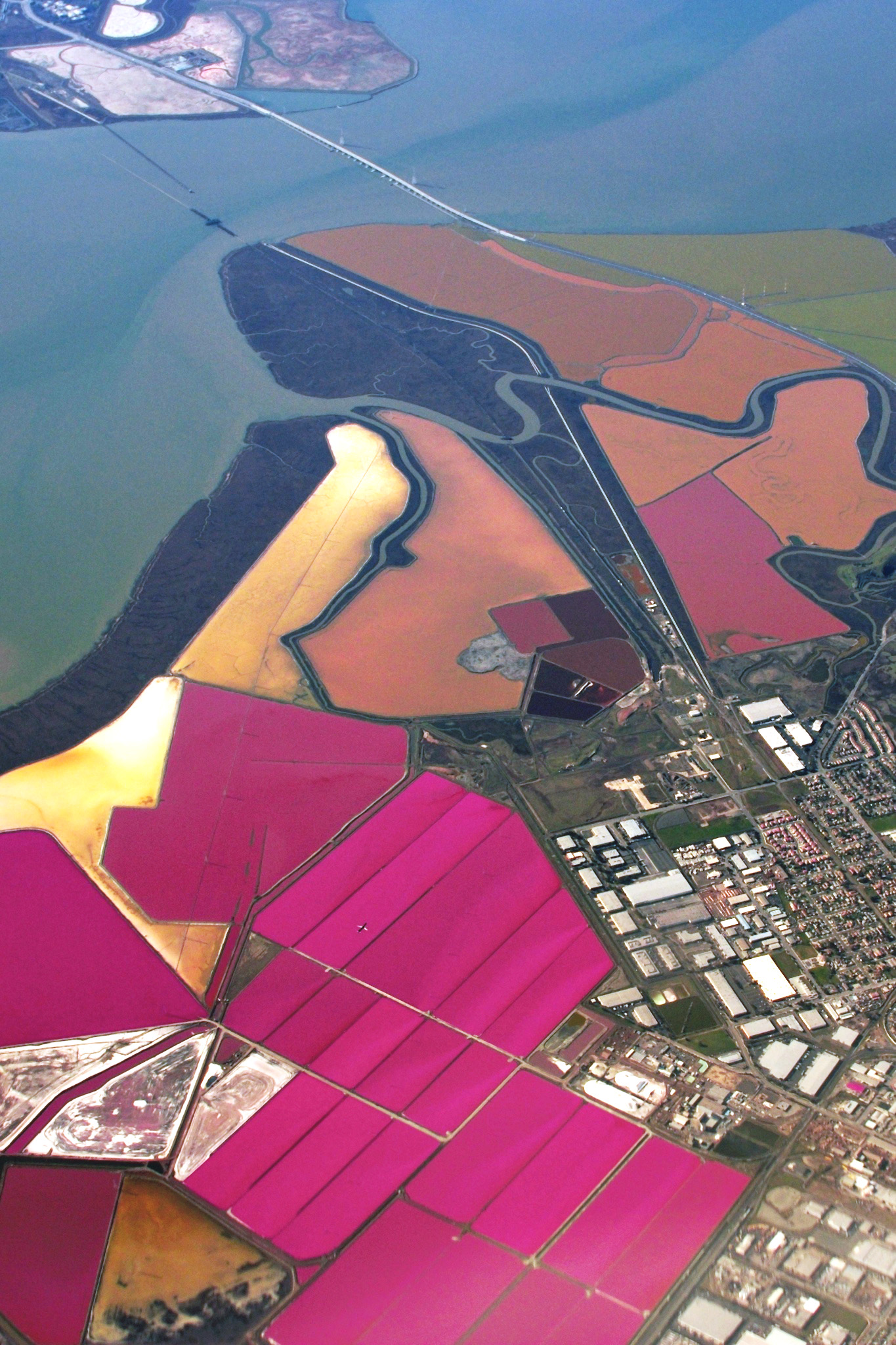
Purple bacteriorhodopsin in Halobacteria at Cargill's salt evaporation ponds in San Francisco Bay, located at Newark, California

Microbial rhodopsins, also known as bacterial rhodopsins, are retinal-binding proteins that provide light-dependent ion transport and sensory functions in halophilic and other bacteria. They are integral membrane proteins with seven transmembrane helices, the last of which contains the attachment point (a conserved lysine) for retinal. Most microbial rhodopsins pump inwards, however "mirror rhodopsins" which function outwards have been discovered.

This protein family includes light-driven proton pumps, ion pumps and ion channels, as well as light sensors. For example, the proteins from halobacteria include bacteriorhodopsin and archaerhodopsin, which are light-driven proton pumps; halorhodopsin, a light-driven chloride pump; and sensory rhodopsin, which mediates both photoattractant (in the red) and photophobic (in the ultra-violet) responses. Proteins from other bacteria include proteorhodopsin.

As their name indicates, microbial rhodopsins are found in Archaea and Bacteria, and also in Eukaryota (such as algae) and viruses; although they are rare in complex multicellular organisms.

== Nomenclature ==
Rhodopsin was originally a synonym for "visual purple", a visual pigment (light-sensitive molecule) found in the retinas of frogs and other vertebrates, used for dim-light vision, and usually found in rod cells. This is still the meaning of rhodopsin in the narrow sense, any protein evolutionarily homologous to this protein. In a broad non-genetic sense, rhodopsin refers to any molecule, whether related by genetic descent or not (mostly not), consisting of an opsin and a chromophore (generally a variant of retinal). All animal rhodopsins arose (by gene duplication and divergence) late in the history of the large G-protein coupled receptor (GPCR) gene family, which itself arose after the divergence of plants, fungi, choanoflagellates and sponges from the earliest animals. The retinal chromophore is found solely in the opsin branch of this large gene family, meaning its occurrence elsewhere represents convergent evolution, not homology. Microbial rhodopsins are, by sequence, very different from any of the GPCR families.

The term bacterial rhodopsin originally referred to the first microbial rhodopsin discovered, known today as bacteriorhodopsin. The first bacteriorhodopsin turned out to be of archaeal origin, from Halobacterium salinarum. Since then, other microbial rhodopsins have been discovered, rendering the term bacterial rhodopsin ambiguous.

== Table ==
Below is a list of some of the more well-known microbial rhodopsins and some of their properties.

Function	Name	Abbr.	Ref.
proton pump (H+)	bacteriorhodopsin	BR	
proton pump (H+)	proteorhodopsin	PR	
proton pump (H+)	archaerhodopsin	Arch	
proton pump (H+)	xanthorhodopsin	xR	
proton pump (H+)	Gloeobacter rhodopsin	GR	
cation channel (+)	channelrhodopsin	ChR	
cation pump (Na+)	Krokinobacter eikastus rhodopsin 2	KR2	
anion pump (Cl-)	halorhodopsin	HR	
photosensor	sensory rhodopsin I	SR-I	
photosensor	sensory rhodopsin II	SR-II	
photosensor	Neurospora opsin I	NOP-I	
light-activated enzyme	rhodopsin guanylyl cyclase	RhGC	

== The ion-translocating microbial rhodopsin family ==
The ion-translocating microbial rhodopsin (MR) family ("TC# 3.E.1". Transporter Classification Database (tcdb.org).) is a member of the TOG Superfamily of secondary carriers. Members of the MR family catalyze light-driven ion translocation across microbial cytoplasmic membranes or serve as light receptors. Most proteins of the MR family are all of about the same size (250-350 amino acyl residues) and possess seven transmembrane helical spanners with their N-termini on the outside and their C-termini on the inside. There are nine subfamilies in the MR family:

1. Bacteriorhodopsins pump protons out of the cell;
2. Halorhodopsins pump chloride (and other anions such as bromide, iodide and nitrate) into the cell;
3. Sensory rhodopsins, which normally function as receptors for phototactic behavior, are capable of pumping protons out of the cell if dissociated from their transducer proteins;
4. the Fungal Chaperones are stress-induced proteins of ill-defined biochemical function, but this subfamily also includes a H^{+}-pumping rhodopsin;
5. the bacterial rhodopsin, called Proteorhodopsin, is a light-driven proton pump that functions as does bacteriorhodopsins;
6. the Neurospora crassa retinal-containing receptor serves as a photoreceptor (Neurospora ospin I);
7. the green algal light-gated proton channel, Channelrhodopsin-1;
8. Sensory rhodopsins from cyanobacteria.
9. Light-activated rhodopsin/guanylyl cyclase

A phylogenetic analysis of microbial rhodopsins and a detailed analysis of potential examples of horizontal gene transfer have been published.

=== Structure ===
Among the high resolution structures for members of the MR Family are the archaeal proteins, bacteriorhodopsin, archaerhodopsin, sensory rhodopsin II, halorhodopsin, as well as an Anabaena cyanobacterial sensory rhodopsin (TC# 3.E.1.1.6) and others.

=== Function ===
The association of sensory rhodopsins with their transducer proteins appears to determine whether they function as transporters or receptors. Association of a sensory rhodopsin receptor with its transducer occurs via the transmembrane helical domains of the two interacting proteins. There are two sensory rhodopsins in any one halophilic archaeon, one (SRI) that responds positively to orange light but negatively to blue light, the other (SRII) that responds only negatively to blue light. Each transducer is specific for its cognate receptor. An x-ray structure of SRII complexed with its transducer (HtrII) at 1.94 Å resolution is available (1H2S). Molecular and evolutionary aspects of the light-signal transduction by microbial sensory receptors have been reviewed.

== Homologues ==
Homologues include putative fungal chaperone proteins, a retinal-containing rhodopsin from Neurospora crassa, a H^{+}-pumping rhodopsin from Leptosphaeria maculans, retinal-containing proton pumps isolated from marine bacteria, a green light-activated photoreceptor in cyanobacteria that does not pump ions and interacts with a small (14 kDa) soluble transducer protein and light-gated H^{+} channels from the green alga, Chlamydomonas reinhardtii. The N. crassa NOP-1 protein exhibits a photocycle and conserved H^{+} translocation residues that suggest that this putative photoreceptor is a slow H^{+} pump.

Most of the MR family homologues in yeast and fungi are of about the same size and topology as the archaeal proteins (283–344 amino acyl residues; seven putative transmembrane α-helical segments), but they are heat shock- and toxic solvent-induced proteins of unknown biochemical function. They have been suggested to function as pmf-driven chaperones that fold extracellular proteins, but only indirect evidence supports this postulate. The MR family is distantly related to the seven TMS LCT family (TC# 2.A.43). Representative members of MR family can be found in the Transporter Classification Database.

=== Bacteriorhodopsin ===
Bacteriorhodopsin pumps one H^{+} ion, from the cytosol to the extracellular medium, per photon absorbed. Specific transport mechanisms and pathways have been proposed. The mechanism involves:

1. photo-isomerization of the retinal and its initial configurational changes,
2. deprotonation of the retinal Schiff base and the coupled release of a proton to the extracellular membrane surface,
3. the switch event that allows reprotonation of the Schiff base from the cytoplasmic side.

Six structural models describe the transformations of the retinal and its interaction with water 402, Asp85, and Asp212 in atomic detail, as well as the displacements of functional residues farther from the Schiff base. The changes provide rationales for how relaxation of the distorted retinal causes movements of water and protein atoms that result in vectorial proton transfers to and from the Schiff base. Helix deformation is coupled to vectorial proton transport in the photocycle of bacteriorhodopsin.

Most residues participating in the trimerization are not conserved in bacteriorhodopsin, a homologous protein capable of forming a trimeric structure in the absence of bacterioruberin. Despite a large alteration in the amino acid sequence, the shape of the intratrimer hydrophobic space filled by lipids is highly conserved between archaerhodopsin-2 and bacteriorhodopsin. Since a transmembrane helix facing this space undergoes a large conformational change during the proton pumping cycle, it is feasible that trimerization is an important strategy to capture special lipid components that are relevant to the protein activity.

=== Archaerhodopsin ===
Ground state structure of Archaerhodopsin-3, showing the covalently bound retinal group: PDB:6S6C.

Archaerhodopsins are light-driven H^{+} ion transporters. They differ from bacteriorhodopsin in that the claret membrane, in which they are expressed, includes bacterioruberin, a second chromophore thought to protect against photobleaching. Bacteriorhodopsin also lacks the omega loop structure that has been observed at the N-terminus of the structures of several archaerhodopsins.

Archaerhodopsin-2 (AR2) is found in the claret membrane of Halorubrum sp. It is a light-driven proton pump. Trigonal and hexagonal crystals revealed that trimers are arranged on a honeycomb lattice. In these crystals, bacterioruberin binds to crevices between the subunits of the trimer. The polyene chain of the second chromophore is inclined from the membrane normal by an angle of about 20 degrees and, on the cytoplasmic side, it is surrounded by helices AB and DE of neighboring subunits. This peculiar binding mode suggests that bacterioruberin plays a structural role for the trimerization of AR2. When compared with the aR2 structure in another crystal form containing no bacterioruberin, the proton release channel takes a more closed conformation in the P321 or P6(3) crystal; i.e., the native conformation of protein is stabilized in the trimeric protein-bacterioruberin complex.

Mutants of Archaerhodopsin-3 (AR3) are widely used as tools in optogenetics for neuroscience research.

=== Channelrhodopsins ===
Channelrhodopsin-1 (ChR1) or channelopsin-1 (Chop1; Cop3; CSOA) of C. reinhardtii is closely related to the archaeal sensory rhodopsins. It has 712 aas with a signal peptide, followed by a short amphipathic region, and then a hydrophobic N-terminal domain with seven probable TMSs (residues 76-309) followed by a long hydrophilic C-terminal domain of about 400 residues. Part of the C-terminal hydrophilic domain is homologous to intersection (EH and SH3 domain protein 1A) of animals (AAD30271).

Chop1 serves as a light-gated proton channel and mediates phototaxis and photophobic responses in green algae. Based on this phenotype, Chop1 could be assigned to TC category #1.A, but because it belongs to a family in which well-characterized homologues catalyze active ion transport, it is assigned to the MR family. Expression of the chop1 gene, or a truncated form of that gene encoding only the hydrophobic core (residues 1-346 or 1–517) in frog oocytes in the presence of all-trans retinal produces a light-gated conductance that shows characteristics of a channel passively but selectively permeable to protons. This channel activity probably generates bioelectric currents.

A homologue of ChR1 in C. reinhardtii is channelrhodopsin-2 (ChR2; Chop2; Cop4; CSOB). This protein is 57% identical, 10% similar to ChR1. It forms a cation-selective ion channel activated by light absorption. It transports both monovalent and divalent cations. It desensitizes to a small conductance in continuous light. Recovery from desensitization is accelerated by extracellular H^{+} and a negative membrane potential. It may be a photoreceptor for dark adapted cells. A transient increase in hydration of transmembrane α-helices with a t(1/2) = 60 μs tallies with the onset of cation permeation. Aspartate 253 accepts the proton released by the Schiff base (t(1/2) = 10 μs), with the latter being reprotonated by aspartic acid 156 (t(1/2) = 2 ms). The internal proton acceptor and donor groups, corresponding to D212 and D115 in bacteriorhodopsin, are clearly different from other microbial rhodopsins, indicating that their spatial positions in the protein were relocated during evolution. E90 deprotonates exclusively in the nonconductive state. The observed proton transfer reactions and the protein conformational changes relate to the gating of the cation channel.

=== Halorhodopsins ===
Bacteriorhodopsin pumps one Cl^{−} ion, from the extracellular medium into the cytosol, per photon absorbed. Although the ions move in the opposite direction, the current generated (as defined by the movement of positive charge) is the same as for bacteriorhodopsin and the archaerhodopsins.

=== Marine bacterial rhodopsin ===
A marine bacterial rhodopsin has been reported to function as a proton pump. However, it also resembles sensory rhodopsin II of archaea as well as an Orf from the fungus Leptosphaeria maculans (AF290180). These proteins exhibit 20-30% identity with each other.

== Transport reaction ==
The generalized transport reaction for bacterio- and sensory rhodopsins is:

H^{+} (in) + hν → H^{+} (out).

That for halorhodopsin is:

Cl^{−} (out) + hν → Cl^{−} (in).

== See also ==
- Bacteriorhodopsin
- Proteorhodopsin
- Opsin
