= Omega loop =

The omega loop is a non-regular protein structural motif, consisting of a loop of six or more amino acid residues and any amino acid sequence. The defining characteristic is that residues that make up the beginning and end of the loop are close together in space with no intervening lengths of regular secondary structural motifs. It is named after its shape, which resembles the upper-case Greek letter Omega (Ω).

== Structure ==
Omega loops, being non-regular, non-repeating secondary structural units, have a variety of three-dimensional shapes. Omega loop shapes are analyzed to identify recurring patterns in dihedral angles and overall loop shape to help identify potential roles in protein folding and function.

Since loops are almost always at the protein surface, it is often assumed that these structures are flexible; however, different omega loops exhibit ranges of flexibility across different time scales of protein motion and have been identified as playing a role in the folding of some proteins, including HIV-1 reverse transcriptase; cytochrome c; and nucleases.

== Function ==
Omega loops can contribute to protein function. For example, omega loops can help stabilize interactions between protein and ligand, such as in the enzyme triose phosphate isomerase, and can directly affect protein function in other enzymes. A heritable coagulation disorder is caused by a single-site mutation in an omega loop of protein C.

Likewise, omega loops play an interesting role in the function of the beta-lactamases: mutations in the "omega loop region" of a beta-lactamase can change its specific function and substrate profile, perhaps due to an important functional role of the correlated dynamics of the region.

=== Cytochrome c ===
Omega loops have long been recognized also for their importance in the function and folding of the protein cytochrome c, contributing both key functional residues and well as important dynamic properties. Many researchers have studied omega loop function and dynamics in specific protein systems using a so-called "loop swap" approach, in which loops are swapped between (usually) homologous proteins.
