= Macular sparing =

Macular sparing is visual field loss that preserves vision in the center of the visual field, otherwise known as the macula. It appears in people with damage to one hemisphere of their visual cortex, and occurs simultaneously with bilateral homonymous hemianopia or homonymous quadrantanopia. The exact mechanism behind this phenomenon is still uncertain. The opposing effect, where vision in half of the center of the visual field is lost, is known as macular splitting.

== Causes ==
The favored explanation for why the center visual field is preserved after large hemispheric lesions is that the macular regions of the cortex have a double vascular supply from the middle cerebral artery (MCA) and the posterior cerebral artery (PCA). If there is damage to one vascular pathway, like in the case of a MCA or PCA stroke, there is still another blood supply that the macular portions of the visual cortex can rely on. Vision in the center of the visual field is then preserved whereas vision in peripheral areas is lost due to the resulting infarct.

Another possible reason is that the maculae project to both hemispheres, so in the event of a lesion in one hemisphere, the other intact hemisphere will still receive and process visual information from the maculae in both eyes.

== Diagnoses ==
Macular sparing can be determined with visual field testing. The macula is defined as an area of approximately + 8 degrees around the center of the visual field. During examination, vision in an area of greater than 3 degrees must be preserved for a patient to be considered to have macular sparing because there is involuntary eye movement within 1 to 2 degrees.

== Implications ==
Macular sparing is usually a product of unilateral visual cortex lesions, not optic tract or lateral geniculate nucleus lesions in the thalamus. This can help diagnose whether a patient's visual field loss is due to cortical damage, or optic tract or thalamic damage. Note that macular sparing does not always occur in patients with visual cortex damage. Patients with macular sparing often retain their ability to perform high resolution visual acuity tasks. For example, they can read fairly well because they can process the entirety of a word presented to their center field of vision like a person with normal vision. Patients with macular splitting fare much more poorly on such tasks, particularly if they lose vision in their right visual field. This is because the right visual field projects to the left hemisphere, where most people are language dominant.

People with macular sparing may experience difficulty with moving around, especially in crowds, because they might unintentionally bump into people or objects in their periphery where they cannot see.

== See also ==
- Hemianopsia
- Binasal hemianopsia
- Bitemporal hemianopsia
