= Confrontation visual field testing =

- Purpose: For rapid detection of large-scale visual field problems

Confrontation visual field testing is a test used in ophthalmology for rapid and gross detection of large-scale visual field problems. It is done by asking the patient to look directly at the examiner's eye or nose and compare the patient's visual field with the examiner's field. It can be used to test the binocular visual field (with both eyes open) and or the visual field of each eye separately (with one eye closed).

== Indications ==
Confrontation visual field testing is an important part of a routine ophthalmological or neurological examination. It can be used for rapid and gross assessment of large-scale visual field problems due to ophthalmological or neurological diseases, such as homonymous and heteronymous hemianopias, quadranopsia, altitudinal visual loss, central/centrocecal scotoma etc. Test using a red target can detect red-desaturation, a sign of early optic nerve disease.

== Procedure ==
Confrontation visual field testing does not need a clinical setting to perform. It can be done in any well-illuminated room. Since the visual fields of both eyes overlap in the nasal area, each eye is tested separately. Patient is asked to sit in front of the examiner, at a distance between 66 and 100 cm, maintaining the eye level same as examiner's. Patient is asked to remove his/her spectacles before starting the test. For testing the right eye field, the patient is asked to close his left eye, and look straight at the examiner's left eye (preferably) or nose. Examiner should also close his/her right eye. Move a finger or bead-on-a-stick inwards from an area outside the usual 180º visual field, and ask the patient when they first see the targets. Alternatively, the patient may be asked to count the number of fingers the examiner shows or identify wiggling fingers. For an accurate assessment of the patient's visual field, it is essential that the distance of all test objects from the patient is the same as the distance from the examiner. The Examiner should compare the point at which the patient sees the target with his own visual field. Repeat the procedure for all eight meridians.

Record the type of target used and whether there are any significant abnormalities in the patient's visual field. Colored targets such as red are more sensitive than a white test target. The test reliability may improve when techniques like finger counting, finger wiggling, identifying a target etc. are combined. Confrontation testing can be done with both eyes open also. It is done for testing the binocular visual field.

== Advantages and disadvantages ==
Confrontational visual field testing is a simple, easy, quick and inexpensive clinical technique that can be used for gross assessment of large-scale visual field problems, such as homonymous and heteronymous hemianopias, quadranopsia etc. But testing is less useful for detecting arcuate scotoma, bitemporal hemianopsia, and visual field loss associated with parasellar tumors, glaucoma, and compressive optic neuropathies. The test reliability may improve when techniques like finger counting, finger wiggling, and identifying a target are combined. To compare a patient's visual field with their own visual field, the examiner should have a full field of vision without any defects.
