= Anopsia =

Defect in one's visual field

- Other names: Anopia
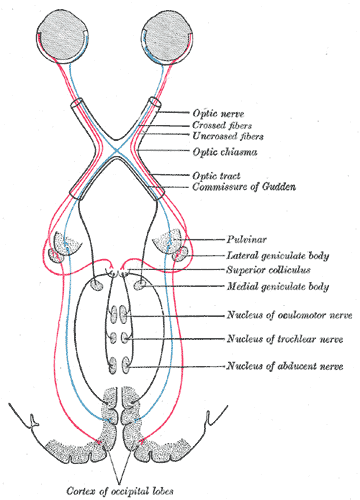
- Scheme showing central connections of the optic nerves and optic tracts. (Lesions at different locations relate to different types of anopsias.)
- Specialty: Neurology

An anopsia, or anopia, (from Ancient Greek ἀν- (an-) 'without' and ὄψις (opsis) 'sight') is a defect in the visual field. If the defect is only partial, then the portion of the field with the defect can be used to isolate the underlying cause. It is particularly used to describe the lack of sight in one eye.

== Variants ==
Types of partial anopsia include:

- Hemianopsia
  - Homonymous hemianopsia
  - Heteronymous hemianopsia
    - Binasal hemianopsia
    - Bitemporal hemianopsia
  - Superior hemianopia
  - Inferior hemianopia
- Quadrantanopia
