= MT-TH =

Transfer RNA in the species Homo sapiens

mitochondrially encoded tRNA histidine

Identifiers
- Symbol: MT-TH
- Alt. symbols: MTTH
- NCBI gene: 4564
- HGNC: 7487
- OMIM: 590040
- RefSeq: NC_001807

Other data
- Locus: Chr. MT

Mitochondrially encoded tRNA histidine, also known as MT-TH, is a transfer RNA which, in humans, is encoded by the mitochondrial MT-TH gene.

== Structure ==
The MT-TH gene is located on the p arm of the mitochondrial DNA at position 12 and it spans 69 base pairs. The structure of a tRNA molecule is a distinctive folded structure which contains three hairpin loops and resembles a three-leafed clover.

== Function ==
MT-TH is a small 69 nucleotide transfer RNA (human mitochondrial map position 12138–12206) that transfers the amino acid histidine to a growing polypeptide at the ribosomal site of protein synthesis during translation.

== Clinical significance ==
Mutations in MT-TH can result in multiple mitochondrial deficiencies and associated disorders. MT-TH is associated with mitochondrial encephalomyopathy, lactic acidosis, and stroke-like episodes (MELAS), cardiomyopathy, and the MELAS/MERRF overlap syndrome.

=== Mitochondrial encephalomyopathy, lactic acidosis, and stroke-like episodes (MELAS) ===
A small number of people with symptoms of mitochondrial encephalomyopathy, lactic acidosis, and stroke-like episodes (MELAS) have been found to have mutations in the MT-TH gene. MELAS is a rare mitochondrial disorder known to affect many parts of the body, especially the nervous system and the brain. Symptoms of MELAS include recurrent severe headaches, muscle weakness (myopathy), hearing loss, stroke-like episodes with a loss of consciousness, seizures, and other problems affecting the nervous system.

=== MERRF/MELAS overlap syndrome ===
MELAS syndrome may also be accompanied by another mitochondrial disorder called myoclonic epilepsy with ragged-red fibers, also known as MERRF syndrome. In addition to symptoms of MELAS syndrome, additional signs and symptoms may include muscle twitches (myoclonus), difficulty coordinating movement (ataxia), and abnormal muscle cells known as ragged-red fibers. The combination of MERRF and MELAS is called the MERRF/MELAS overlap syndrome, which is caused by mutations in the MT-TH gene. It has not been determined how such mutations alter the energy production function of the mitochondria and result in symptoms of such syndromes. A specific mutation of 12147G>A in the MT-TH gene has been found to result in the MERRF/MELAS overlap syndrome. A patient with the mutation exhibited symptoms of migrainous headache and vomiting, left hemiparesis, lateral homonymous hemianopia, and others consistent with the MERRF/MELAS overlap syndrome. The patient exhibited symptoms of MELAS first, then progressed into the overlap syndrome.

=== Cardiomyopathy ===
Mutations in the MT-TH gene may also cause cardiomyopathy, a disorder of the heart characterized by the thickening of the heart, usually in the interventricular septum, which results in a weakened heart muscle that is unable to pump blood effectively. Patients with mutations in the MT-TH gene have been found to exhibit symptoms of cardiomyopathy without other common signs of mitochondrial disease such as neurological abnormalities. It is unclear why such mutations result in the symptoms of isolated cardiomyopathy. A specific mutation of 12192G>A in the MT-TH gene has been found in multiple patients with the disorder. patients exhibited symptoms of cardiomyopathy in different forms.

=== Deafness, Nonsyndromic Sensorineural, Mitochondrial ===
Deafness has also been associated with mutations in the MT-TH gene. Heteroplasmic 12201T>C transitions in MT-TH have been found in a family exhibiting symptoms of nonsyndromic sensorineural deafness, varying in time of onset and severity.
