= Meridian (vision) =

In ophthalmology, meridians are axes that are used to describe the visual field. Meridians are important in perimetry, which "is the measurement of [an observer's] visual functions ... at topographically defined loci in the visual field. The visual field is that portion of the external environment of the observer [in which when he or she is] steadily fixating ...[he or she] can detect visual stimuli."

In perimetry, the observer's eye is considered to be at the centre of an imaginary sphere. More precisely, the centre of the sphere is in the centre of the pupil of the observer's eye. The observer is looking at a point, the fixation point, on the interior of the sphere. The visual field can be considered to be all parts of the sphere for which the observer can see a particular test stimulus. If we consider this surface to be that on which an observer can see anything, then it is a section of the sphere somewhat larger than a hemisphere. In reality it is smaller than this, and irregular, because when the observer is looking straight ahead, his or her nose blocks vision of some possible parts of the surface. In perimetric testing, a section of the imaginary sphere is realized as a hemisphere in the centre of which is a fixation point. Test stimuli can be displayed on the hemisphere.

To specify loci in the visual field, a polar coordinate system is used, all expressed from the observer's perspective. The origin corresponds to the point on which the observer is fixating. The polar angle is considered to be zero degrees when a locus is horizontally to the right of the fixation point and to increase to a maximum of 360 degrees going anticlockwise. Distance from the origin is given in degrees of visual angle; it's a measure of eccentricity. Each polar axis is a meridian of the visual field. For example, the horizontal meridian runs from the observer's left, through the fixation point, and to the observer's right. The vertical meridian runs from above the observer's line of sight, through the fixation point, and to below the observer's line of sight.

Another way of thinking of the maximum visual field is to think of all of the retina that can be reached by light from the external environment. The visual field in this case is all of the external environment that can project light onto the retina. Meridians correspond to sections of great circles passing through the centre of the fovea. In an analogy to Meridian (geography), in which meridians are lines of longitude, the North Pole might correspond to the fovea, Greenwich would correspond to a retinal location about 39 degrees to the left of the fovea (because the retinal image is inverted, this corresponds to a location in the visual field to the observer's right), and the South Pole would correspond to the centre of the pupil.

The meridian of the visual field has been found to influence the folding of the cerebral cortex. In both the V1 and V2 areas of macaques and humans the vertical meridian of their visual field tends to be represented on the cerebral cortex's convex gyri folds whereas the horizontal meridian is tends to be represented in their concave sulci folds.

== See also ==
- Angle of view
- Field of view
- Peripheral vision
