= Visual field =

Area in visual space that can be seen when the eye fixates a point

The visual field is "that portion of space in which objects are visible at the same moment during steady fixation of the gaze in one direction"; in ophthalmology and neurology the emphasis is mostly on the structure inside the visual field and it is then considered "the field of functional capacity obtained and recorded by means of perimetry".

However, the visual field can also be understood as a predominantly perceptual concept and its definition then becomes that of the "spatial array of visual sensations available to observation in introspectionist psychological experiments" (for example in van Doorn et al., 2013).

The corresponding concept for optical instruments and image sensors is the field of view (FOV). In humans and animals, the FOV refers to the area visible when eye movements – if possible for the species – are allowed.

In optometry, ophthalmology, and neurology, a visual field test is used to determine whether the visual field is affected by diseases that cause local scotoma or a more extensive loss of vision or a reduction in sensitivity (increase in threshold).

== Normal limits ==
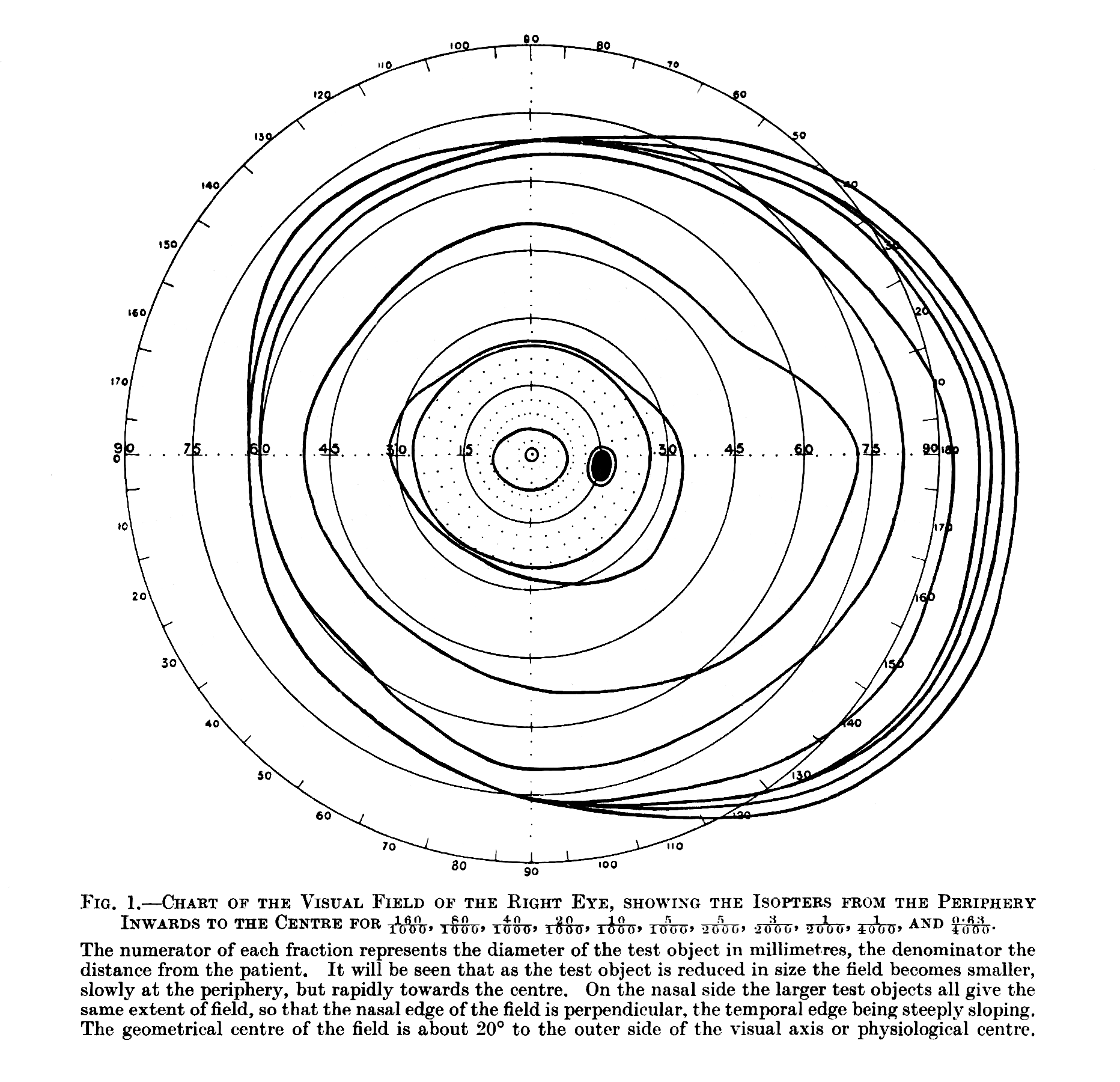
The classical image on the shape and size of the visual field by Harry Moss Traquair in his book Clinical Perimetry (1938; modified to show the essentials). It shows that the visual field is considerably larger on the temporal side than the often quoted 90° extent. Similar limits were already reported in the 19th century.

The normal (monocular) human visual field extends to approximately 60 degrees nasally (toward the nose, or inward) from the vertical meridian in each eye, to 107 degrees temporally (away from the nose, or outwards) from the vertical meridian, and approximately 70 degrees above and 80 below the horizontal meridian.

The binocular visual field is the superimposition of the two monocular fields. In the binocular field, the area left of the vertical meridian is referred to as the left visual field (which is located temporally for the left, and nasally for the right eye); a corresponding definition holds for the right visual field. The four areas delimited by the vertical and horizontal meridian are referred to as upper/lower left/right quadrants. In the European Union, the minimum field requirement for driving is 50 degrees to either side of the vertical meridian and 120 degrees horizontally in total, and 20 degrees above and below the horizontal meridian. The macula corresponds to the central 17 degrees diameter of the visual field; the fovea to the central 5.2 degrees, and the foveola to 1–1.2 degrees diameter. Note that in the clinical literature the fovea can refer to the central 1–1.2 deg, i.e. what is otherwise known as the foveola, and can be referred to as the "clinical fovea".

The nose is situated in the field of view of both eyes, but due to later processing carried out in the brain, it is not noticed during normal visual tasks.

== Measuring the visual field ==
The visual field is measured by perimetry. This may be kinetic, where spots of light are shown on the white interior of a half sphere and slowly moved inwards until the observer sees them, or static, where the light spots are flashed at varying intensities at fixed locations in the sphere until detected by the subject. Commonly used perimeters are the automated Humphrey Field Analyzer, Optopol Perimeters, Octopus, the Heidelberg Edge Perimeter, the Oculus or the Olleyes VisuALL.

Another method is to use a campimeter, a small device with a flat screen designed to measure the central visual field.

Light spot patterns testing the central 24 degrees or 30 degrees of the visual field, are most commonly used. Most perimeters are also capable of testing up to 80 or 90 or even 120 degrees.

Another method is for the practitioner to hold up one, two, or five fingers in the four quadrants and center of a patient's visual field (with the other eye covered). This is also known as confrontational field testing. If the patient is able to report the number of fingers properly as compared with the visual field of the practitioner, the normal result is recorded as "full to finger counting" (often abbreviated FTFC). The blind spot can also be assessed via holding a small object between the practitioner and the patient. By comparing when the object disappears for the practitioner, a subject's blind spot can be identified. There are many variants of this type of exam (e.g., wiggling fingers in the visual periphery on the cardinal axes).

== Visual field loss ==
Visual field loss may occur due to many disease or disorders of the eye, optic nerve, or brain. For the eye, e.g., Glaucoma causes peripheral field defects. Macular degeneration and other diseases affecting the macula cause central field defects. Lesions of the visual pathway cause characteristic forms of visual disturbances, including homonymous hemianopsia, quadrantanopsia, and scotomata.

The main classification of visual field defects is into

1. Lesions to the eye's retina (heteronymous field defects in Glaucoma and AMD)
2. Lesions of the optic nerve (heteronymous field defects)
3. Lesions in the chiasm (e.g. Bitemporal hemianopia, loss of vision at the sides)
4. Lesions after the chiasm (homonymous field defects like homonymous hemianopia, Quadrantanopia, homonymous scotomata)

Other characterisations are:

1. Altitudinal field defects, loss of vision above or below the horizontal meridian – associated with ocular abnormalities
2. Central scotoma, loss of central vision
3. Peripheral field loss including tunnel vision
4. Generalized depression of the entire field of vision

=== Visual field defects in glaucoma ===
In glaucoma, visual field defects result from damage to the retinal nerve fiber layer. Field defects are seen mainly in primary open angle glaucoma. Because of the unique anatomy of the RNFL, many noticeable patterns are seen in the visual field. Most of the early glaucomatous changes are seen within the central visual field, mainly in Bjerrum's area, 10°-20° from fixation.

Following are the common glaucomatous field defects:

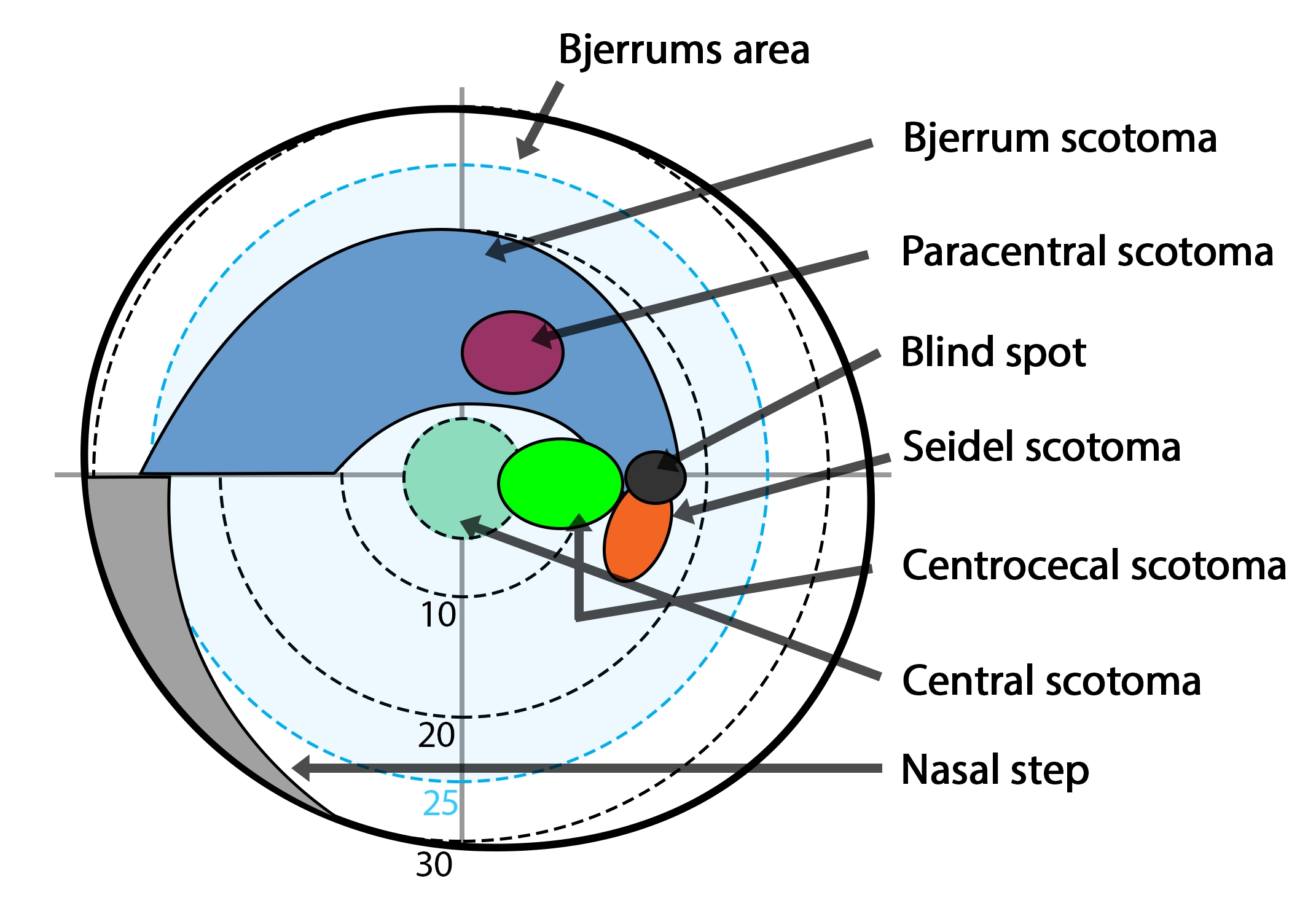
Bjerrum's area and types of scotomas on the visual field

- Generalized depression: Generalized depression is seen in early stages of glaucoma and many other conditions. Mild constriction of the central and peripheral visual field due to isopter contraction comes under generalized depression. If all the isopters show similar depression to the same point, it is called a contraction of the visual field. Relative paracentral scotomas are the areas where smaller and dimmer targets are not detected by the patient. Larger and brighter targets can be seen. Small paracentral depressions, mainly superonasal, occur in normal-tension glaucoma (NTG). The generalized depression of the entire field may occur in cataract also.
- Baring of blind spot: Baring of the blind spot means the exclusion of the blind spot from the central field due to inward curve of the outer boundary of the 30° central field. It is only an early, non-specific visual field change, without much diagnostic value in glaucoma.
- Small wing-shaped paracentral scotoma: Small wing-shaped paracentral scotoma within Bjerrum's area is the earliest clinically significant field defect seen in glaucoma. It may also be associated with nasal steps. Scotoma may be seen above or below the blind spot.
- Siedel's sickle-shaped scotoma: Paracentral scotoma joins with the blind spot to form Siedel's sickle-shaped scotoma.
- Arcuate or Bjerrum's scotoma: This kind of scotoma is formed at later stages of glaucoma by extension of Seidel's scotoma in an area either above or below the fixation point to reach the horizontal line. Peripheral breakthrough may occur due to damage of nerve fibers.
- Ring or double arcuate scotoma: Two arcuate scotomas join to form a ring or double arcuate scotoma. This defect is seen in advanced stages of glaucoma.
- Roenne's central nasal step: It is created when two arcuate scotomas run in different arcs to form a right angled defect. This is also seen in advanced stages of glaucoma.
- Peripheral field defects: Peripheral field defects may occur in early or late stages of glaucoma. Roenne's peripheral nasal steps occur due to contraction of peripheral isopter.
- Tubular vision: Since macular fibers are the most resistant to glaucomatous damage, central vision remains unaffected until the end stages of glaucoma. It results in tubular vision, or tunnel vision, by the loss of peripheral vision with retention of central vision, resulting in a constricted circular tunnel-like field of vision. Retinitis pigmentosa is another disease that causes tubular vision.
- Temporal island of vision: It is also seen in end stages of glaucoma. The temporal islands lie outside of the central 24 to 30° visual field, so it may not be visible with standard central field measurements done in glaucoma.

=== Field defects in macular degeneration (AMD) ===
The macula of the retina is the central area in the visual field of about 10 to 17 deg diameter (in visual angle). It is responsible for high-resolution vision in good light, in particular for reading. Many diseases affecting the macula may cause defects in the central field of vision, among them metamorphopsia and central scotomas.

=== Field defects in visual pathway lesions ===
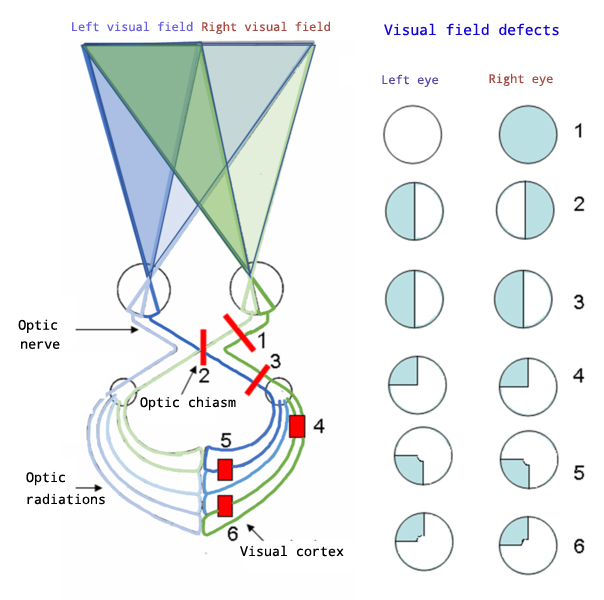
Visual pathway lesions From top to bottom: 1. Complete loss of vision in the right eye; 2. Bitemporal hemianopia; 3. Homonymous hemianopia; 4. Quadrantanopia; 5. & 6. Quadrantanopia with macular sparing

The visual pathway consists of structures that carry visual information from the retina to the brain. Lesions in the pathway cause a variety of visual field defects. The type of field defect can help localize where the lesion is located (see figure).

- A lesion in the optic nerve of one eye causes partial or complete loss of vision in the same eye, with an intact field of vision in other eye.
- A lesion at the proximal part of optic nerve of one eye cause, central field defect in one eye and temporal half-field defect in the other eye (not shown in the figure).
- A lesion in the center of the optic chiasma causes bitemporal hemianopia
- A lesion to the optic tract, or involving the complete optic radiation causes homonymous hemianopia
- When part of the optic radiation in the parietal lobe is affected, the resulting field defect may be inferior quadrant hemianopia

=== Neurological causes of visual field defects ===
- Cerebral palsy: Field loss due to cerebral palsy may be hemianopic affecting even upper or lower half, central scotoma, peripheral scotoma, or islands of vision.
- Epilepsy: Although field defects are rarely associated with epilepsy, defects may occur after temporal lobe surgery for epilepsy.
- Periventricular leukomalacia (PVL): Bilateral inferior visual field defects may occur due to damage of the optic radiations.

=== Other causes of field defects ===
- Generalized depression is seen in cataract
- Central visual field loss is seen in Optic neuritis, Leber hereditary optic neuropathy, Macular hole, Cone dystrophy, Branch retinal artery occlusion etc.
- Peripheral visual field loss including tunnel vision is seen in Retinal detachment, Retinitis pigmentosa, Branch retinal vein occlusion etc.
- Hemianopia and quadrantanopia are seen in patients with stroke, traumatic brain injury, tumor etc.
- Altitudinal visual field defect is seen anterior ischemic optic neuropathy, compressive neuropathy (due to a tumor or aneurysm), Branch retinal artery occlusion, Branch retinal vein occlusion, Coloboma, Papilloedema, lesions in visual cortex etc.

== Gallery ==
The following illustrations are a rough attempt at visualizing a number of visual field defects. Note that they do not (and cannot) visualize the percept (i.e. what is seen by the observer). For example, the visual fields for the two eyes are seen as one field. The depiction is (necessarily) much too small. The missing areas are not seen as white or black, or grey – they are simply invisible to the observer, who is, furthermore, typically unaware that they are invisible.

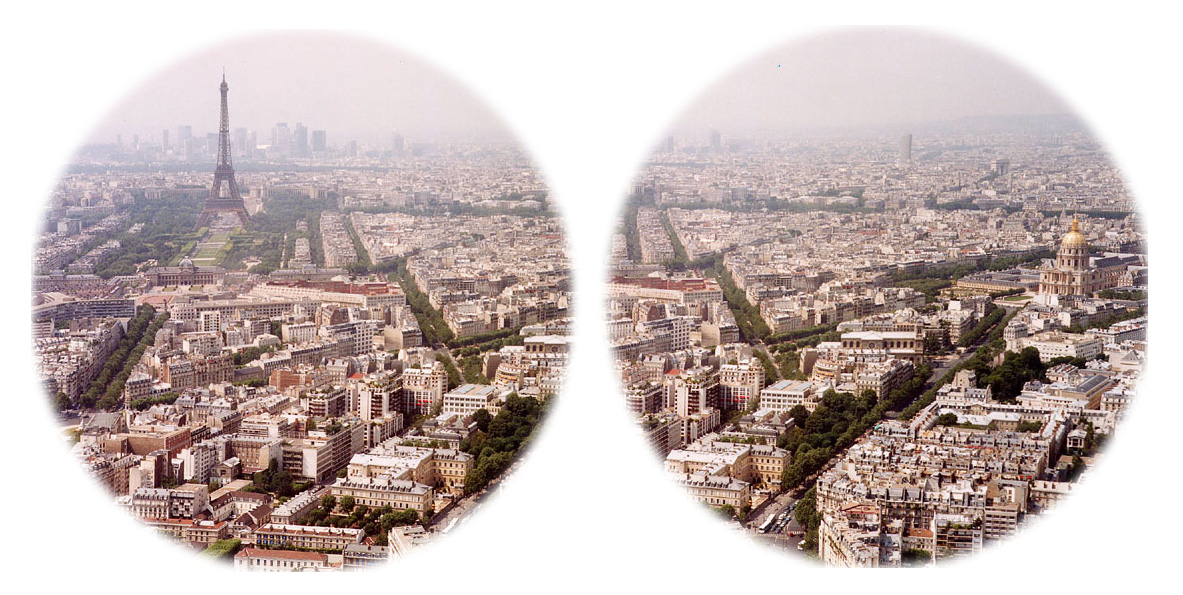
Paris as seen with full visual fields

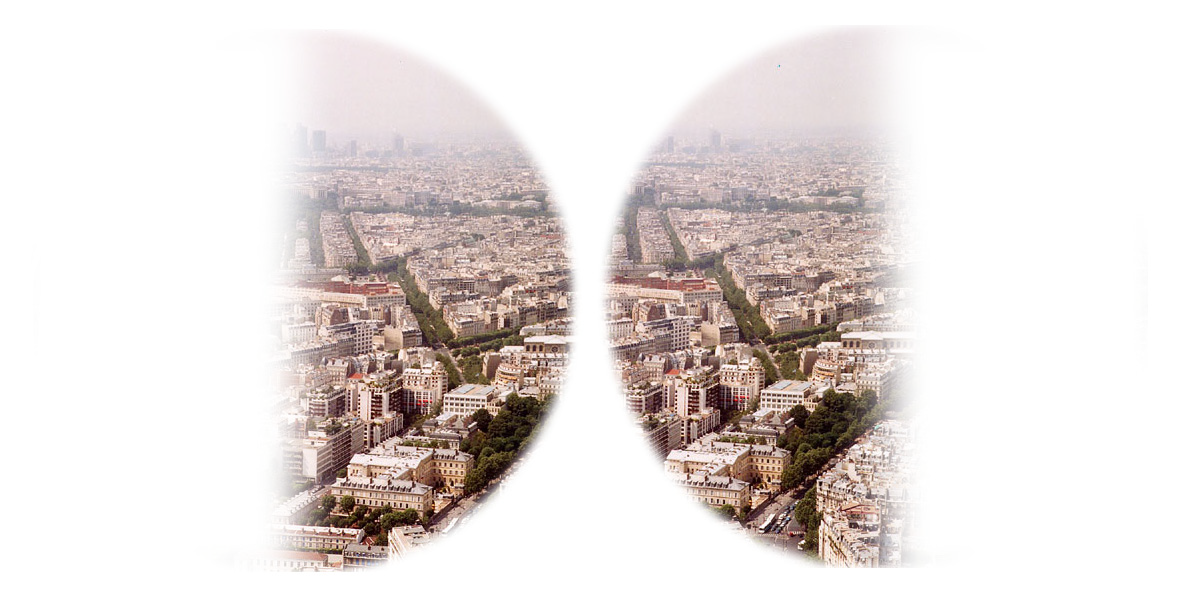
Paris as seen with bitemporal hemianopsia

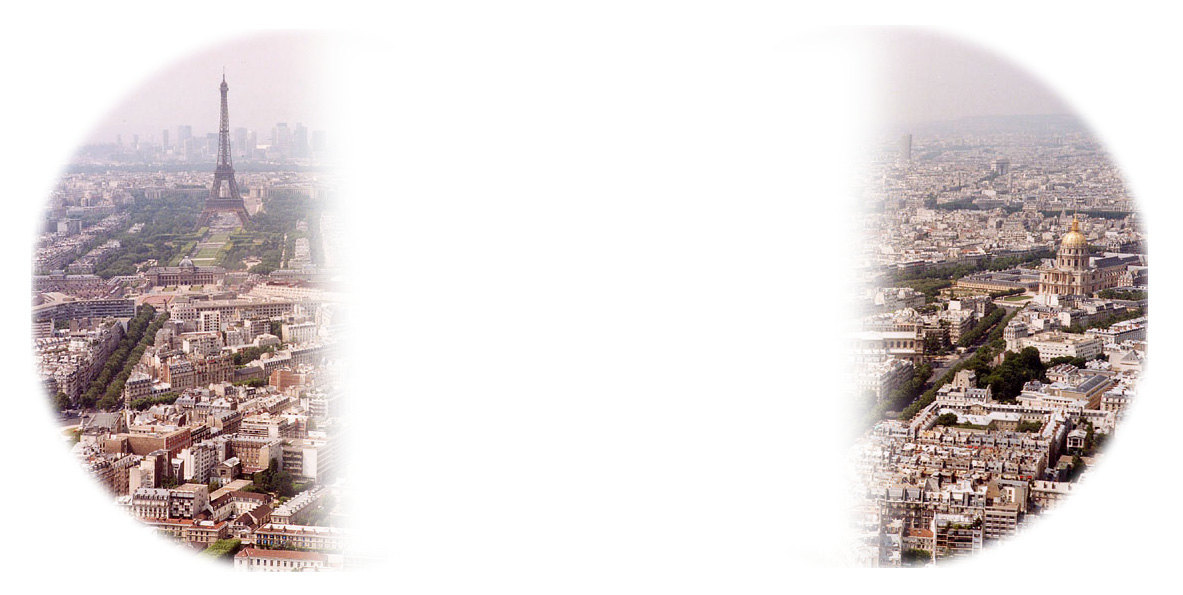
Paris as seen with binasal hemianopsia

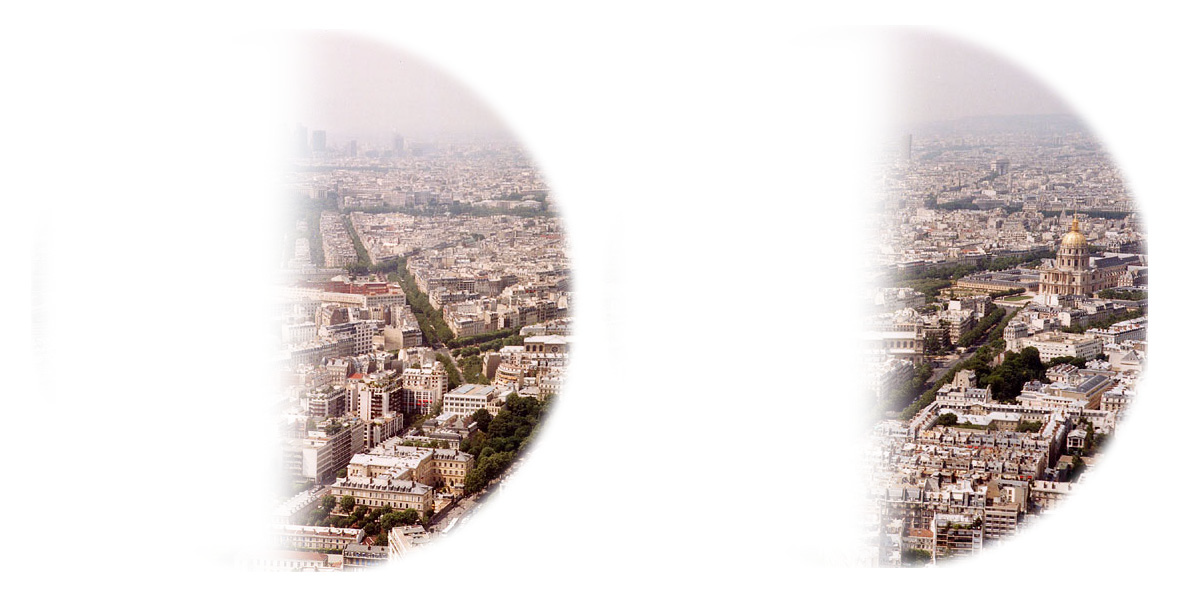
Paris as seen with left homonymous hemianopsia

Paris as seen with right homonymous hemianopsia

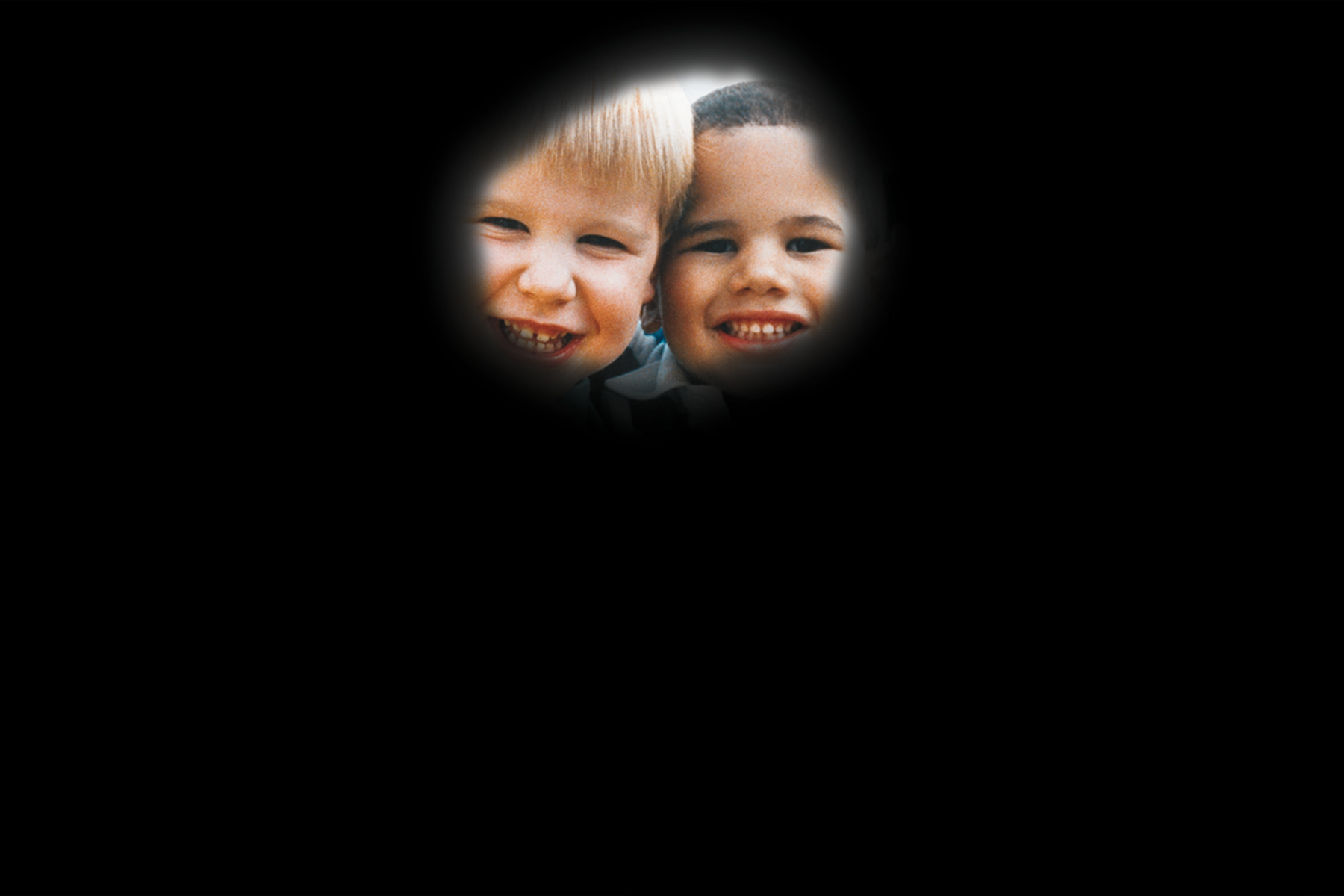
Tubular vision

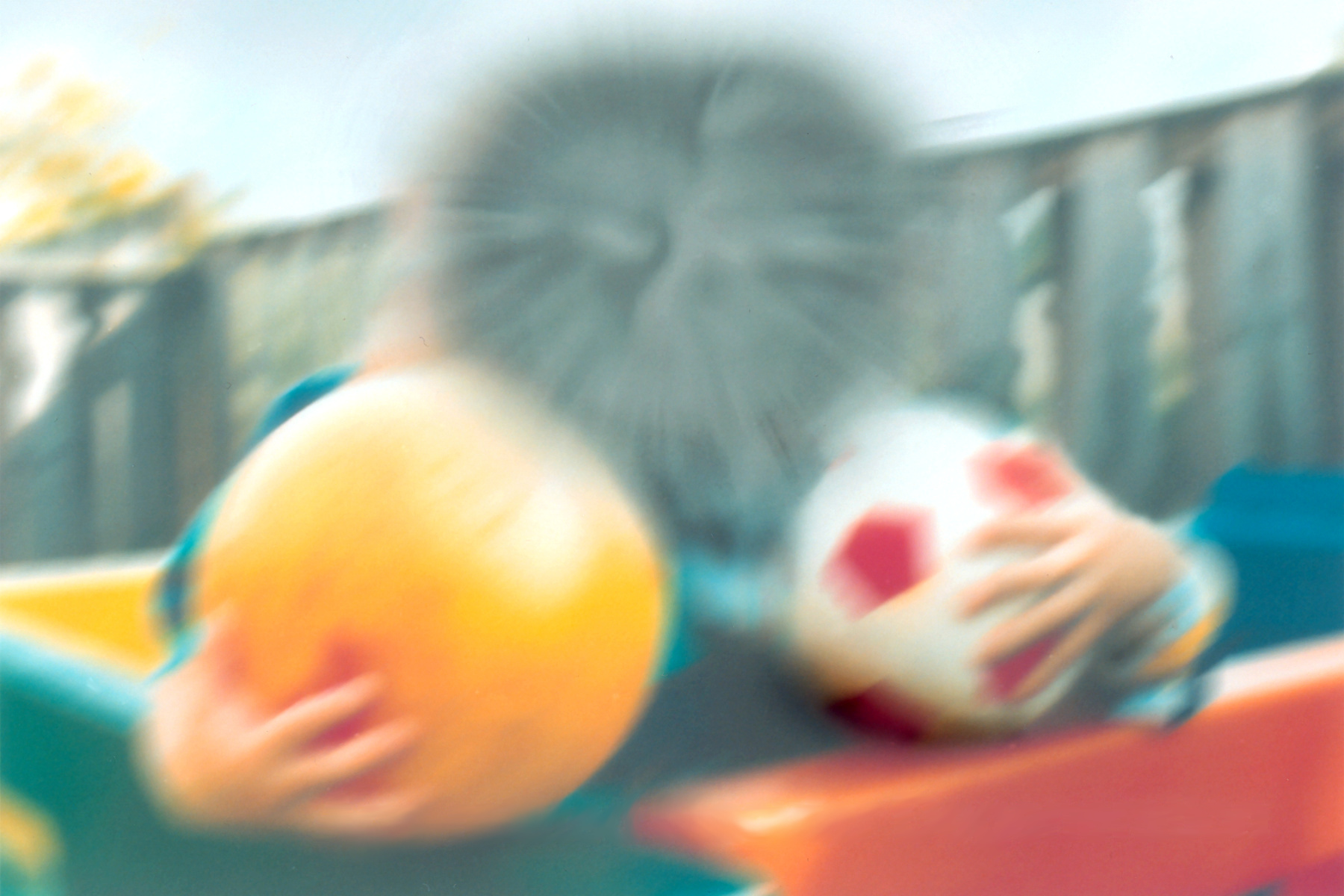
Central field defect in macular degeneration

== See also ==
- Visual field test
- Humphrey visual field analyser
- Biased competition theory
- Divided visual field paradigm
- Receptive field
- Peripheral vision
- Visual snow
