= Optic radiation =

Neural pathway in the visual system

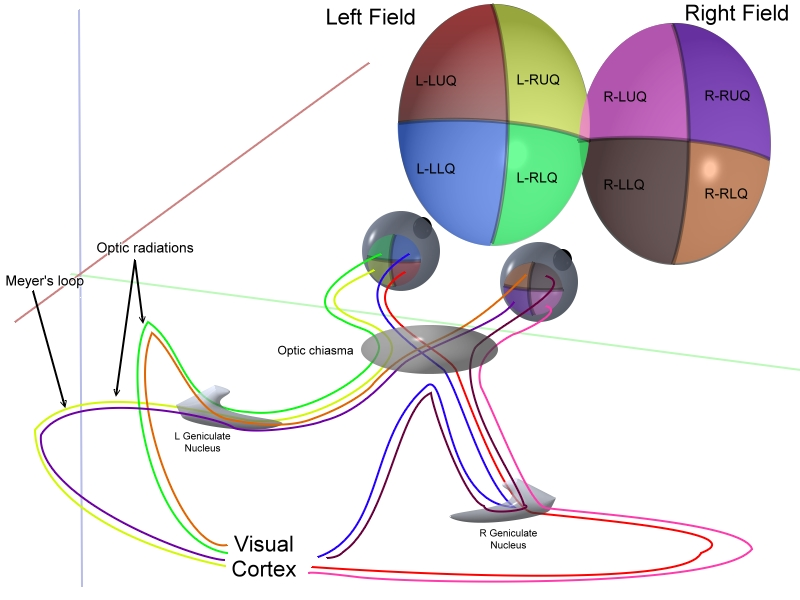
- Colour-coded diagram showing radiations in quadrants from retinal disc through the brain

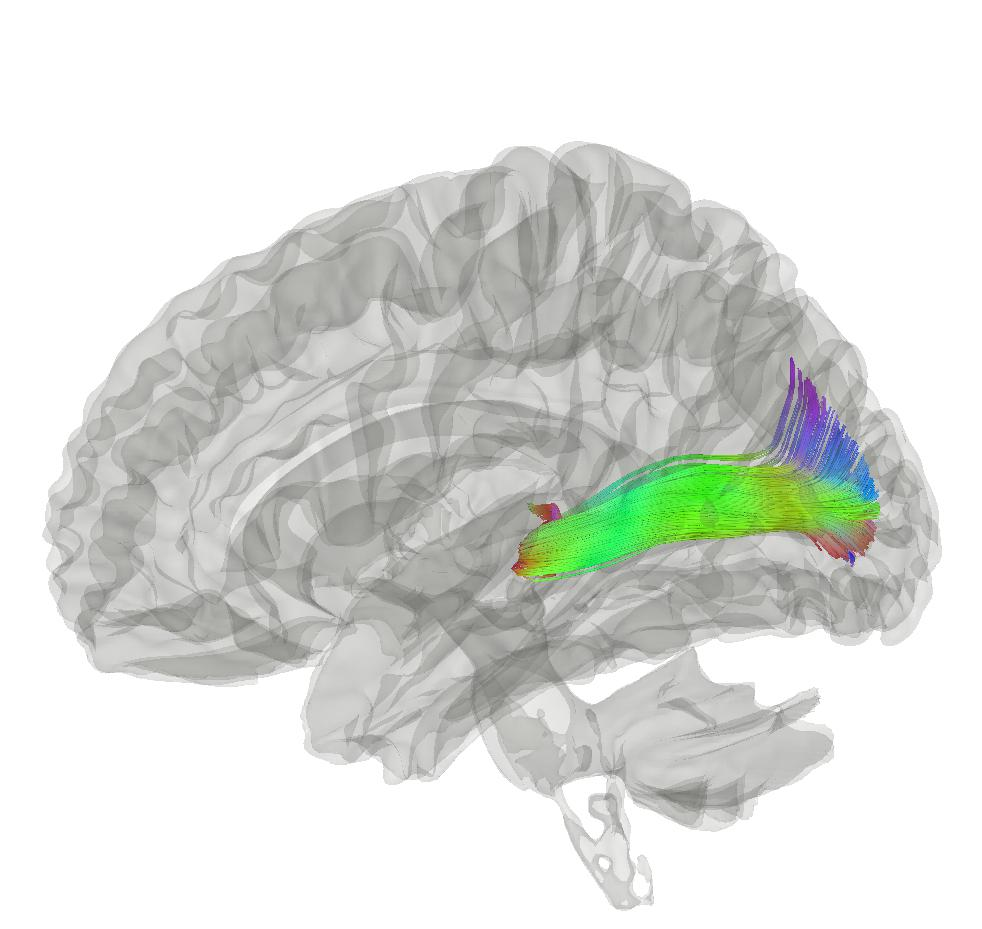
- Tractography showing optic radiation

Details
- System: Visual system
- Function: Vision

Identifiers
- Latin: radiatio optica
- NeuroNames: 1440
- TA98: A14.1.08.673; A14.1.09.542; A14.1.09.547
- TA2: 5584
- FMA: 61941

In neuroanatomy, the optic radiation (also known as the geniculocalcarine tract, the geniculostriate pathway, and posterior thalamic radiation) are axons from the neurons in the lateral geniculate nucleus to the primary visual cortex. The optic radiation receives blood through deep branches of the middle cerebral artery and posterior cerebral artery.

They carry visual information through two divisions (called upper and lower division) to the visual cortex (also called striate cortex) along the calcarine fissure. There is one set of upper and lower divisions on each side of the brain. If a lesion only exists in one unilateral division of the optic radiation, the consequence is called quadrantanopia, which implies that only the respective superior or inferior quadrant of the visual field is affected. If both divisions on one side of the brain are affected, the result is a contralateral homonymous hemianopsia.

== Structure ==
The upper division:

- Projects to the upper bank of the calcarine fissure, called the cuneus
- Contains input from the superior retinal quadrants, which represents the inferior visual field quadrants
- Transection causes contralateral lower quadrantanopia
- Lesions that involve both cunei cause a lower altitudinal hemianopia (altitudinopia)

The lower division:

- Loops from the lateral geniculate body anteriorly (Meyer's loop), then posteriorly, to terminate in the lower bank of the calcarine sulcus, called the lingual gyrus
- Contains input from the inferior retinal quadrants, which represents the superior visual field quadrants
- Transection causes contralateral upper quadrantanopia
- Transection of both lingual gyri causes an upper altitudinal hemianopia

=== Parts ===
A distinctive feature of the optic radiations is that they split into two parts on each side:

Source	Path	Information	Damage
Fibers from the inferior retina (also called "Meyer's loop" or "Archambault's loop")	must pass through the temporal lobe by looping around the inferior horn of the lateral ventricle.	Carry information from the Superior part of the visual field	A lesion in the temporal lobe that results in damage to Meyer's loop causes a characteristic loss of vision in a superior quadrant (quadrantanopia or "pie in the sky" defect.)
Fibers from the superior retina* (the so-called Baum's loop)	travel straight back through the parietal lobe to the occipital lobe in the retrolenticular limb of the internal capsule to the visual cortex.	Carry information from the Inferior part of the visual field	Taking the shorter path, these fibers are less susceptible to damage. Damage caused is characteristically called "Pie in the floor" defect or inferior quadrantanopia.

*Note: In 2009, an anonymous medical doctor edited the "Optic Radiation" Wikipedia article and added the eponymous name "Baum's loop," referring to the dorsal bundle. Despite the information being unverified, this name subsequently entered scholarly articles and textbooks and persisted until three radiologists discovered the fabrication in 2020.

Right superior quadrantanopia. The areas of the visual field lost in each eye are shown as black areas. This visual field defect is characteristic of damage to Meyer's loop on the left side of the brain.

== Function ==
The optic radiation contains feedforward tracts that transmit visual information (from the retina of the eye) from the geniculate nucleus to the visual cortex, and also feedback tracts from the visual cortex to the neurons in the LGN that project to them. The function of the feedback from the visual cortex back to the LGN is unknown. The optic radiation is activated during working memory tasks. The optic radiations are usually unilateral and commonly vascular in origin. Field defects, therefore, develop abruptly, in contrast to the slow progression of defects associated with tumors.

== Clinical significance ==
=== Examination ===
Tracts contained within the optic radiation are examined as part of a cranial nerve examination.

== See also ==
- Optic tract
