= Craniopharyngioma =

Brain tumor of pituitary gland embryonic tissue

Pituicytoma
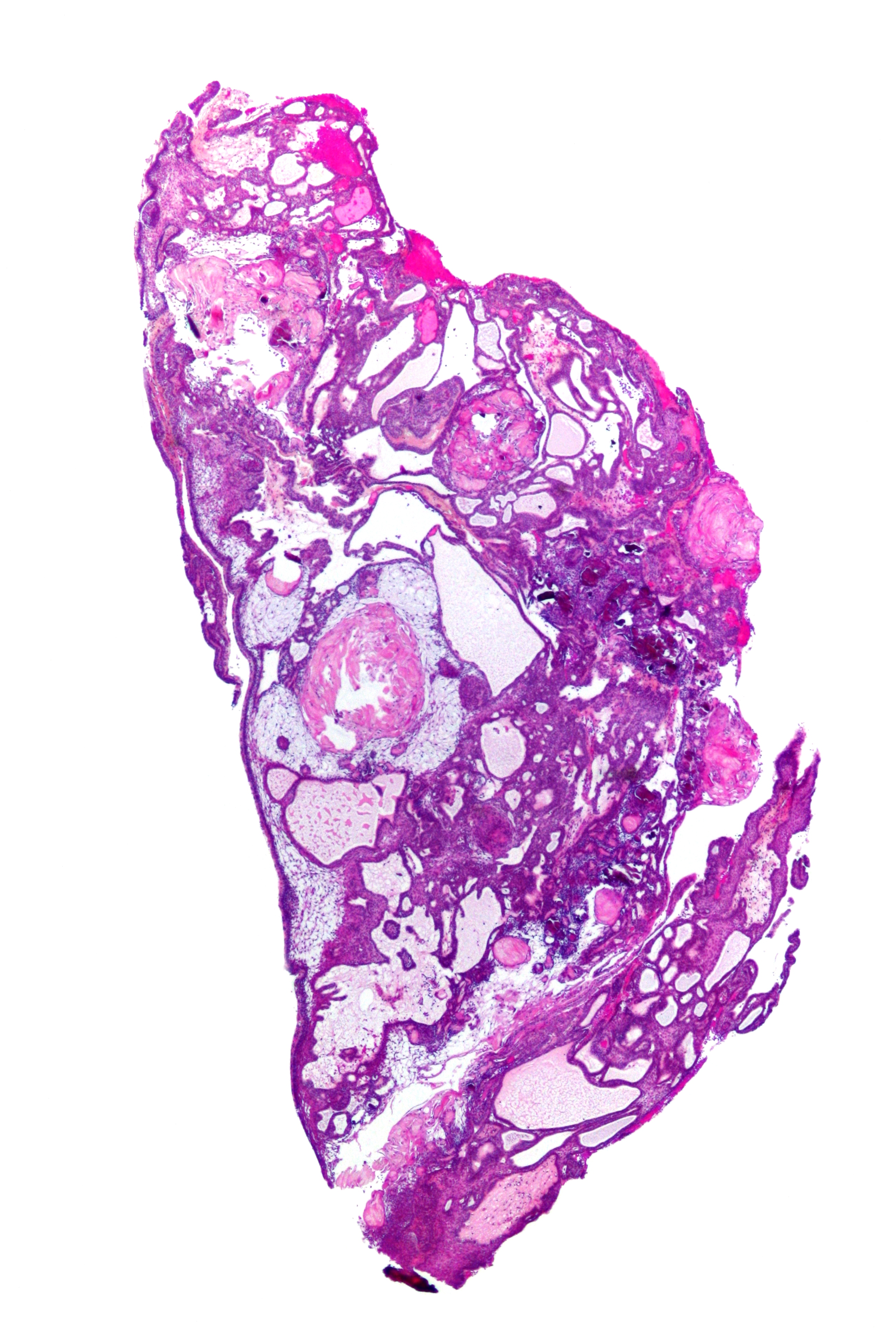
- Very low magnification micrograph of an adamantinomatous craniopharyngioma. HPS stain.
- Specialty: Oncology

A craniopharyngioma is a rare type of brain tumor derived from pituitary gland embryonic tissue that occurs most commonly in children, but also affects adults. It may present at any age, even in the prenatal and neonatal periods, but peak incidence rates are childhood-onset at 5–14 years and adult-onset at 50–74 years. People may present with bitemporal inferior quadrantanopia leading to bitemporal hemianopsia, as the tumor may compress the optic chiasm. It has a point prevalence around two per 1,000,000. Craniopharyngiomas are distinct from Rathke's cleft tumours and intrasellar arachnoid cysts.

== Symptoms and signs ==
Craniopharyngiomas are almost always benign. However, as with many brain tumors, their treatment can be difficult, and significant morbidities are associated with both the tumor and treatment.

- Headache (obstructive hydrocephalus)
- Hypersomnia
- Myxedema
- Postsurgical weight gain (hypothalamic obesity)
- Polydipsia
- Polyuria (diabetes insipidus)
- Vision loss (bitemporal hemianopia)
- Vomiting
  - Often occurs after treatment
- Growth hormone (GH) insufficiency, caused by the reduction in GH production - symptoms include:
  - Stunted growth and delayed puberty (in children)
  - General fatigue, loss of muscle mass and tone (in adults)
- Pituitary insufficiency
  - Often occurs to some degree because craniopharyngiomas develop in the area of the pituitary stalk, which can affect the function of the pituitary gland and many other hormones
  - Reduction in prolactin production is very uncommon and occurs with severe pituitary insufficiency.
    - Large pituitary tumors can paradoxically elevate blood prolactin levels due to the "stalk effect". This elevation occurs as a result of the compression of the pituitary stalk, which interferes with the brain's control of prolactin production.
    - In premenopausal women, elevated prolactin can lead to reduction or loss of menstrual periods and/or breast milk production (galactorrhea).
    - With stalk effect, prolactin levels are usually only slightly elevated, as opposed to prolactinomas in which the prolactin level is usually very high.
- Diabetes insipidus occurs due to the absence of a posterior pituitary hormone called antidiuretic hormone. Symptoms include:
  - Excessive thirst
  - Excessive urination
- Adrenal insufficiency occurs because of a reduction in ACTH production, a reduction in cortisol. In severe cases, it can be fatal. Symptoms include:
  - Fatigue
  - Low blood pressure
  - Electrolyte abnormalities

== Mechanisms ==
Craniopharyngioma is a rare, usually suprasellar neoplasm, which may be cystic, that develops from nests of epithelium derived from Rathke's pouch. Rathke's pouch is an embryonic precursor of the anterior pituitary.

Craniopharyngiomas are typically very slow-growing tumors. They arise from the cells along the pituitary stalk, specifically from nests of odontogenic (tooth-forming) epithelium within the suprasellar/diencephalic region, so contain deposits of calcium that are evident on an X-ray.

There are two types of craniopharyngiomas: the more common adamantinomatous type, and the rarer papillary type. Both types are associated with spontaneous mutations in genes that manage cellular division. The two different mutations are mutually exclusive and cannot co-exist. Both mutations are somatic, meaning they are acquired throughout one’s lifetime and not passed on to offspring. When these mutations transpire, cell proliferation is no longer controlled and tumor formation may occur, usually as slow-growing tumors. The two distinct types of craniopharyngiomas are caused by mutations in different genes. Although there have been other mutations identified to play a role in the development of craniopharyngiomas, CTNNB1 and BRAF mutations are most commonly seen as causative agents for adamantinomatous and papillary craniopharyngiomas, respectively.

Adamantinomatous craniopharyngiomas are caused by spontaneous mutations in the CTNNB1 gene, a proto-oncogene. The CTNNB1 gene encodes a region of the β-catenin protein that allows for it to be inactivated. With the inability to deactivate β-catenin, there is an overaccumulation of the protein in the cytoplasm, causing the Wnt signaling pathway to function excessively. The Wnt pathway is responsible for controlling gene transcription and cell proliferation, and overactivation can cause tumor growths.

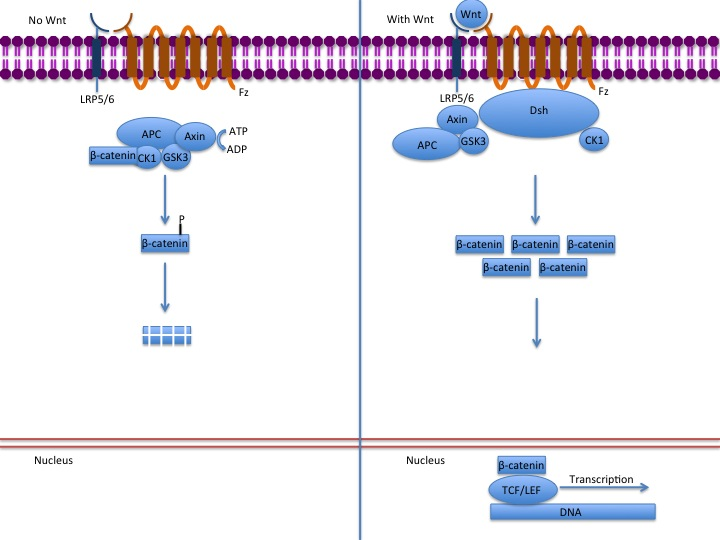
The Wnt signaling pathway, utilizing β-catenin to activate transcription.

Papillary craniopharyngiomas, however, are associated with spontaneous mutations in the BRAF gene. These mutations overactivate mitogen-dependent kinase pathways, ultimately leading to uncontrolled cell growth.

When cell proliferation is uncontrolled, tumor formation can interfere with several brain functions. Craniopharyngiomas can affect the optic nerves, hypothalamus, pituitary gland, and cranial nerves. These invasions often cause headaches, vision problems, and changes in the endocrine system.

== Diagnosis ==
=== Imaging scans for craniopharyngioma ===
A physician can conduct a few scans and tests to diagnose a person with craniopharyngioma. High-resolution magnetic resonance imaging (MRI) is commonly used as a diagnostic tool; however, computer tomography (CT) remains the gold standard imaging choice for craniopharyngioma diagnosis as it can detect the severity of the calcification within the tumour.

In some cases, a powerful 3 T (tesla) MRI scanner can help define the location of critical brain structures affected by the tumor. The histologic pattern consists of nesting of squamous epithelium bordered by radially arranged cells. It is frequently accompanied by calcium deposition and may have a microscopic papillary architecture. A computed tomography (CT) scan is also a good diagnostic tool, as it detects calcification in the tumor.

Two distinct types are recognized:

- Adamantinomatous craniopharyngiomas, which resemble ameloblastomas (the most common type of odontogenic tumor), are characterized by activating CTNNB1 mutations.
- Papillary craniopharyngiomas are characterized by BRAFv600E mutations.

In the adamantinomatous type, calcifications are visible on neuroimaging and are helpful in diagnosis.

The papillary type rarely calcifies. A vast majority of craniopharyngiomas in children are adamantinomatous, whereas both subtypes are common in adults. Mixed-type tumors also occur.

On macroscopic examination, craniopharyngiomas are cystic or partially cystic with solid areas. On light microscopy, the cysts are seen to be lined by stratified squamous epithelium. Keratin pearls may also be seen. The cysts are usually filled with a yellow, viscous fluid rich in cholesterol crystals. Of a long list of possible symptoms, the most common presentations include headaches, growth failure, and bitemporal hemianopsia.

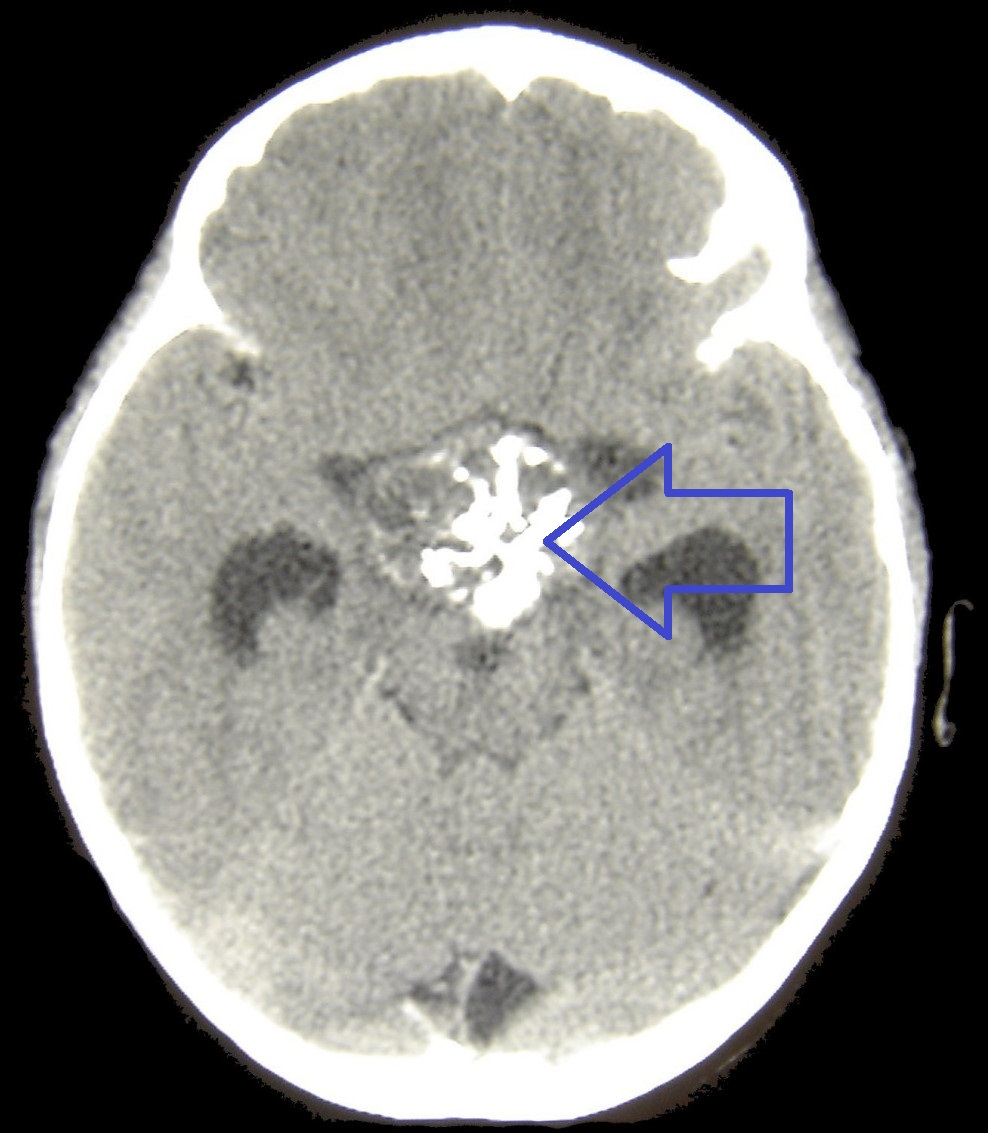
CT scan showing a craniopharyngioma

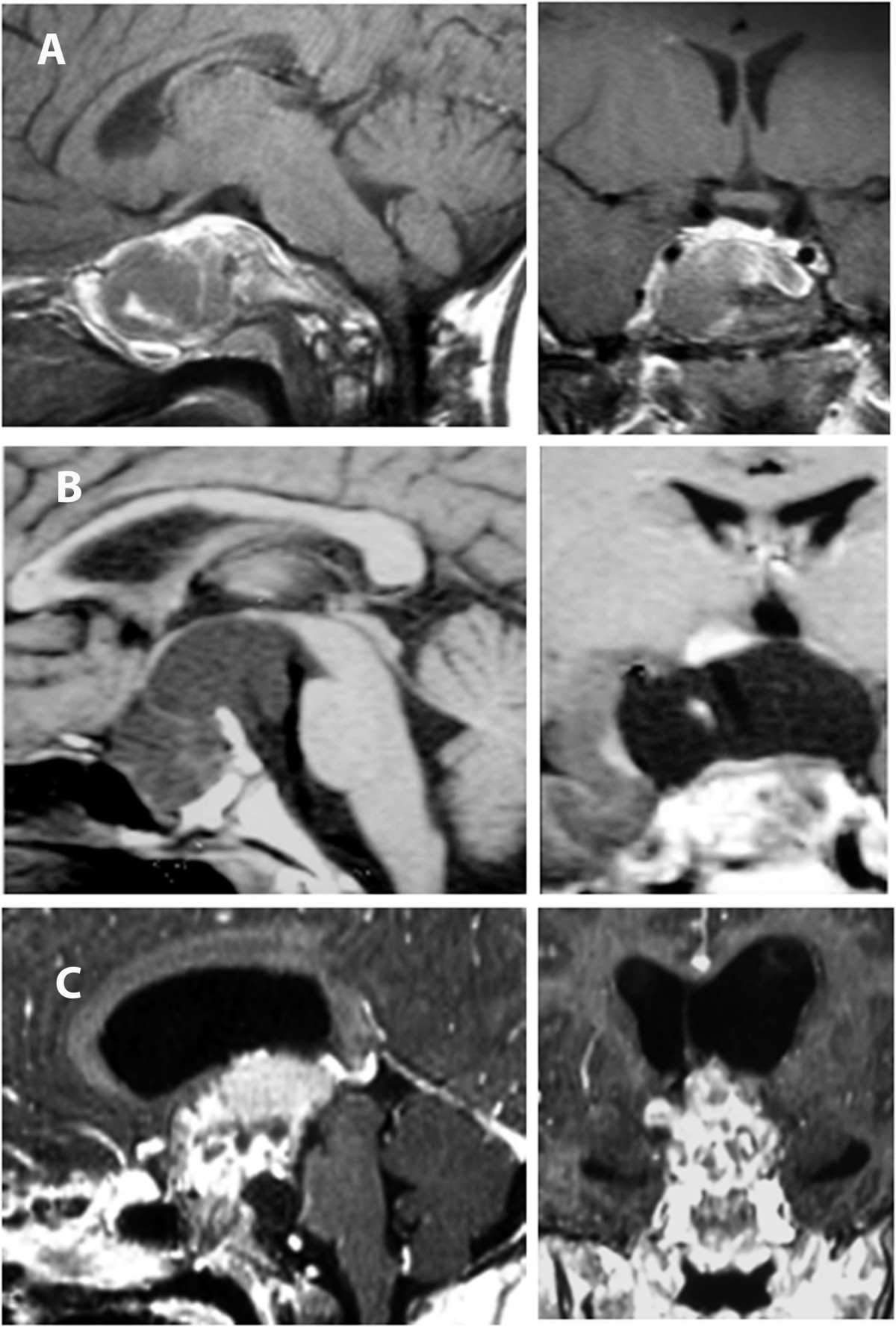
Enhanced T1 weighted MRIs of craniopharyngiomas

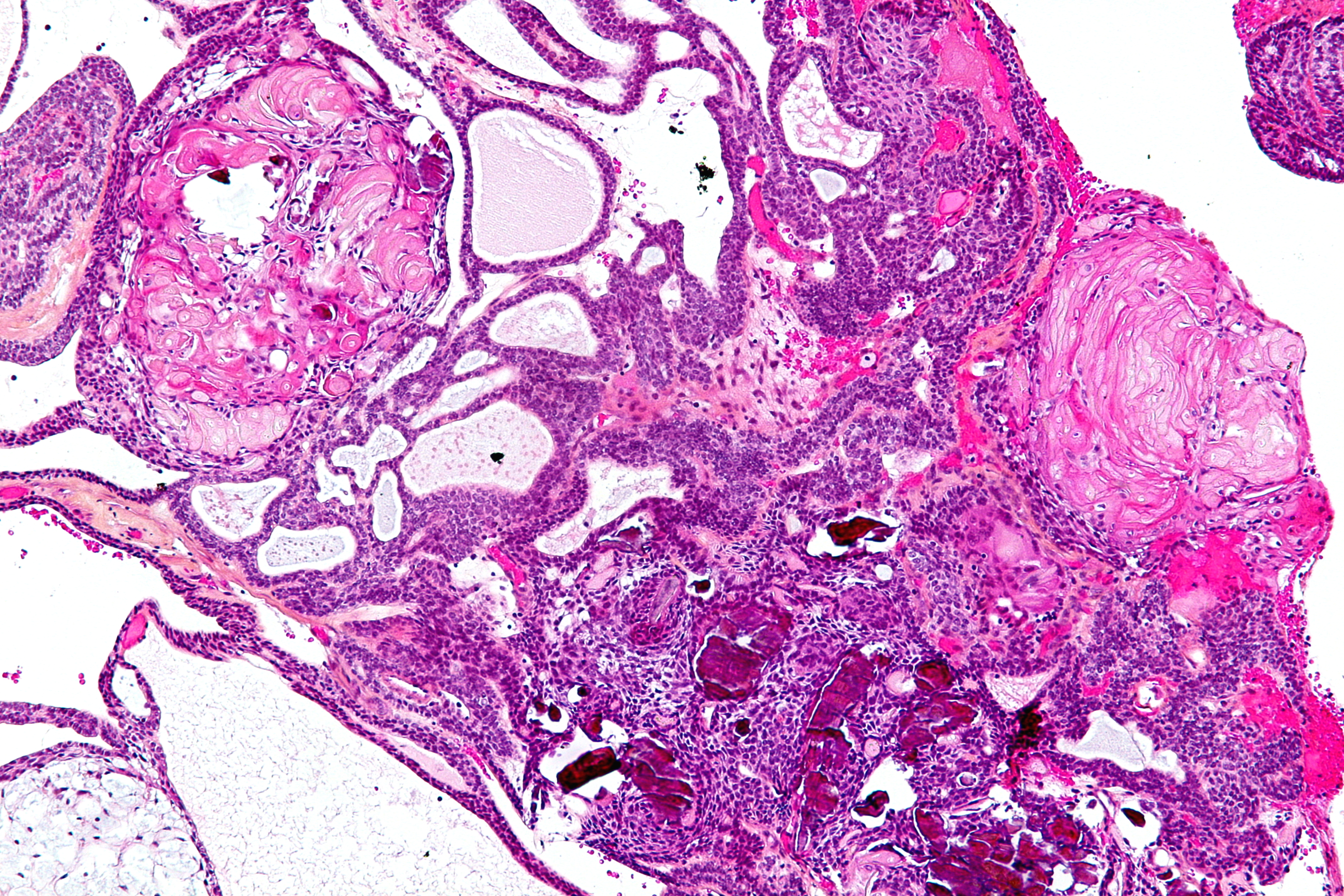
Micrograph showing the characteristic features of an adamantinomatous craniopharyngioma - cystic spaces, calcifications, and "wet" keratin, HPS stain

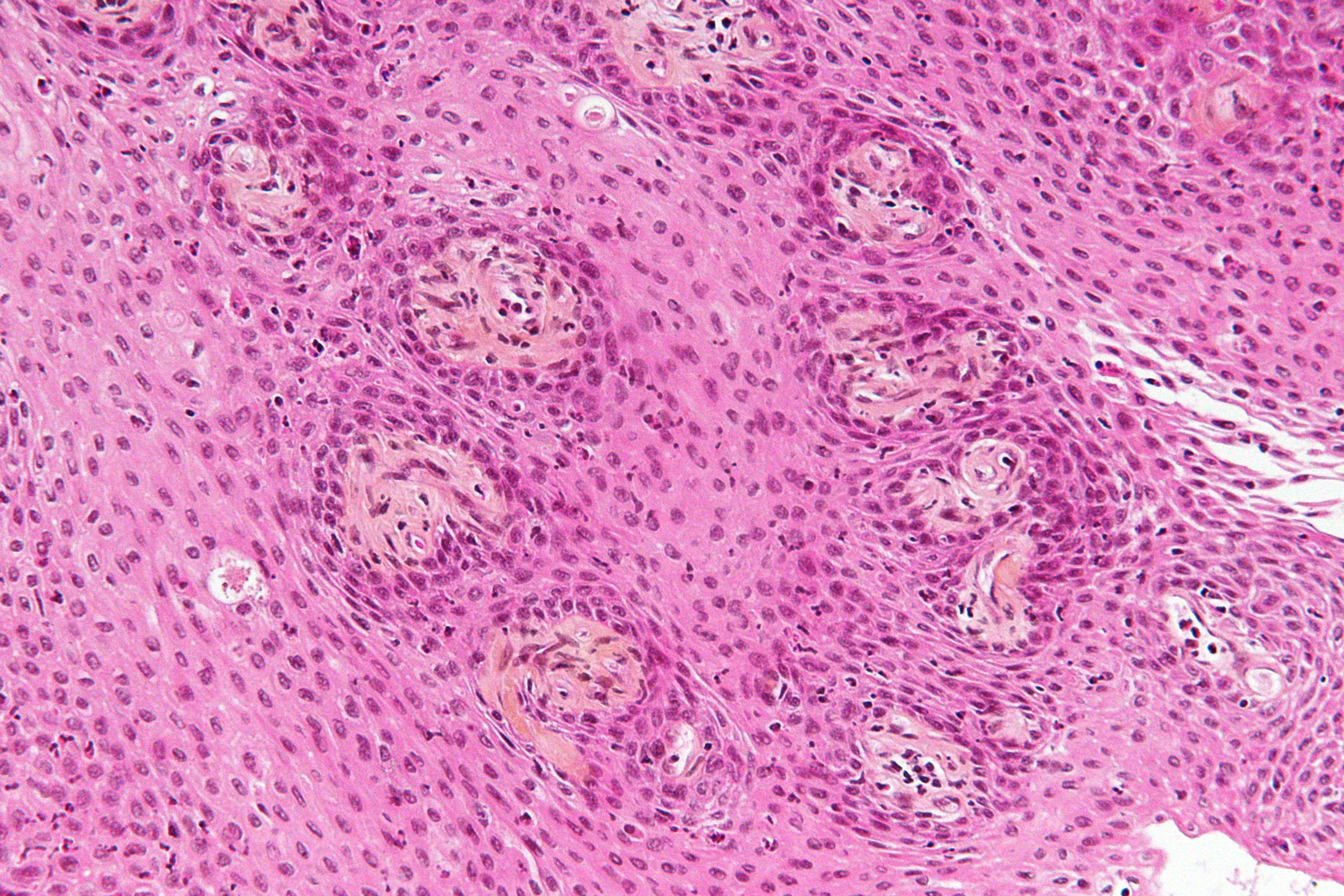
Micrograph showing a papillary craniopharyngioma, HPS stain

=== Malignant craniopharyngioma ===
Craniopharyngiomas are usually successfully managed with a combination of adjuvant chemotherapy and neurosurgery. Recent research describes the rare occurrence of malignant transformations of these normally benign tumors. Malignant craniopharyngiomas can occur at any age, are slightly more common in females, and are usually of the adamantinomatous type.

The malignant transformations can take years to occur (although one in five of the diagnosed cases were de novo transformations), hence the need for lengthier follow-up in patients diagnosed with the more common benign forms.

No link has been found between malignancy and initial chemoradiotherapy treatment, and the overall survival rate was very poor with median survival being 6 months after diagnosis of malignancy.

== Prevention ==
Although the causes of craniopharyngioma are unknown, it can occur in both children and adults, with a peak in incidence at 9 to 14 years of age. About 120 cases are diagnosed each year in the United States in patients under the age of 19. More than 50% of all patients with craniopharyngioma are under the age of 18 years. No clear association of the tumor exists with a particular gender or race. Craniopharyngiomas do not appear to "run in families" or to be directly inherited from the parents.

== Treatment ==
Treatment generally consists of subfrontal or transsphenoidal excision. Endoscopic surgery through the nose often performed by a team of neurosurgeons and ENT, is an alternative to transcranial surgery done by making an opening in the skull. Because of the location of the craniopharyngioma in the skull base of the brain, a surgical navigation system might be used to verify the position of surgical tools during the operation.

Additional radiotherapy is used if total removal is not possible. Due to the poor outcomes associated with damage to the pituitary and hypothalamus from surgical removal and radiation, experimental therapies using intracavitary phosphorus-32, yttrium, or bleomycin delivered via an external reservoir are sometimes employed, especially in young patients. The tumor, being in the pituitary gland, can cause secondary health problems. The immune system, thyroid levels, growth hormone levels, and testosterone levels can be compromised from craniopharyngioma. All of these health problems can be treated with modern medicine. No high quality evidence has evaluated the use of bleomycin in this condition.

Proton therapy affords a reduction in dose to critical structures compared to conventional photon radiation, including IMRT, for patients with craniopharyngioma.

The most effective treatment 'package' for the malignant craniopharyngiomas described in literature is a combination 'gross total resective' surgery with adjuvant chemoradiotherapy. The chemotherapy drugs paclitaxel and carboplatin have shown a clinical (but not statistical) significance in increasing the survival rate in patients who have had gross total resections of their malignant tumours.

== Prognosis ==
Craniopharyngiomas are generally benign but are known to recur after resection. Recent research has demonstrated a malignant (but rare) tendency of craniopharyngiomas. These malignant craniopharyngiomas are very rare but are associated with poor prognosis.

== Recent research ==
Current research has shown ways of treating the tumors in a less invasive way while others have shown how the hypothalamus can be stimulated along with the tumor to prevent the child and adult with the tumor to become obese. A childhood craniopharyngioma is commonly cystic in nature. Limited surgery minimizing hypothalamic damage may decrease the severe obesity rate at the expense of the need for radiotherapy to complete the treatment.

Role of radiotherapy:

Aggressive attempts at total removal do result in prolonged progression-free survival in most patients, but for tumors that clearly involve the hypothalamus, complications associated with radical surgery have prompted to adopt a combined strategy of conservative surgery and radiation therapy to residual tumor with as high a rate of cure. This strategy seems to offer the best long-term control rates with acceptable morbidity. But optimal management of craniopharyngiomas remains controversial. Although it is generally recommended that radiotherapy is given following subtotal excision of a craniopharyngioma, it remains unclear as to whether all patients with residual tumour should receive immediate or differed at relapse radiotherapy. Surgery and radiotherapy are the cornerstones in therapeutic management of craniopharyngioma. Radical excision is associated with a risk of mortality or morbidity particularly as hypothalamic damage, visual deterioration, and endocrine complication between 45 and 90% of cases. The close proximity to neighboring eloquent structures poses a particular challenge to radiation therapy. Modern treatment technologies including fractionated 3-D conformal radiotherapy, intensity modulated radiation therapy, and recently proton therapy are able to precisely cover the target while preserving surrounding tissue, Tumor controls in excess of 90% can be achieved. Alternative treatments consisting of radiosurgery, intracavitary application of isotopes, and brachytherapy also offer an acceptable tumor control and might be given in selected cases. More research is needed to establish the role of each treatment modality.
