= Campimeter =

Ophthalmic instrument for examining the visual field

The campimeter is an instrument for examining the visual field. Campimeters have been in clinical use since the mid-nineteenth century. Initially, examination of the visual field was concerned only with the outer limits, or 'perimeter' of the visual field, hence the term 'perimetry', which tends to be used inter-changeably with 'campimetry'.
