= Microperimetry =

Microperimetry, sometimes called fundus-controlled perimetry, is a type of visual field test which uses one of several technologies to create a "retinal sensitivity map" of the quantity of light perceived in specific parts of the retina in people who have lost the ability to fixate on an object or light source. The main difference with traditional perimetry instruments is that, microperimetry includes a system to image the retina and an eye tracker to compensate eye movements during visual field testing.

== Usage ==
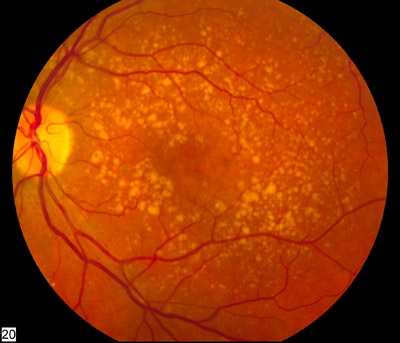
Macular degeneration

Visual field testing is widely used to monitor pathologies affecting the periphery of vision such as glaucoma. During a conventional test, patients are asked to look steady (fixate) at a visual target, while light stimuli are projected at varying intensities in different retinal locations. This process is not, however, considered accurate in the evaluation of pathologies affecting the central part of the retina (macula and fovea centralis) as patients with these pathologies are often unable to fixate reliably. By contrast, fundus perimetry, produces reliable results even in patients with unstable or eccentric fixation, or advance macular degeneration. Importantly, the benefit of fundus tracking has been measured directly. Even in these participants with stable fixation, tracking reduced false responses to stimuli placed inside the physiological blind spot.

When central vision is compromised, as in the case of macular scotoma, patients develop an eccentric or extra-foveal vision, normally with unstable fixation. The retinal area used by eccentric viewers to substitute the foveal vision is known as the Preferred Retinal Locus (PRL) In Microperimetry systems, the fundus (eye) is imaged in real time, while an eye tracker compensates eye movements during stimuli projection, allowing correct matching between expected and projected stimulus position onto the retina. Simultaneously, the eye tracker plots the retinal movement during fixation attempt defining the PRL zone as well as fixation stability. Some microperimetry instruments calculate 2 different PRL zones during the examination. To create the fundus image an infrared telecamera is used, as in the case of the "Nidek-MP1", or a Scanning Laser Ophthalmoscope (SLO), as in the case of the "Centervue-MAIA".

== Microperimetry with Biofeedback ==
In patients with central vision loss, microperimetry experts are able to analyse the eccentric retina in order to find zones with good retinal sensitivity. Once the best retinal area is selected, patients are asked to move their gaze towards that direction, while audio signals guide them to the desired target. This process is called biofeedback, and is based on the theory of brain plasticity. With several training sessions, some patients are able to gain better use of their peripheral vision.
