= Divided visual field paradigm =

Diagram of lateralized visual pathways of the human brain

The Divided Visual Field Paradigm is an experimental technique that involves measuring task performance when visual stimuli are presented on the left or right visual hemifields. If a visual stimulus appears in the left visual field (LVF), the visual information is initially projected to the right cerebral hemisphere (RH), and conversely, if a visual stimulus appears in the right visual field (RVF), the visual information is initially received by the left cerebral hemisphere (LH). In this way, if a cerebral hemisphere has functional advantages with some aspect of a particular task, an experimenter might observe improvements in task performance when the visual information is presented on the contralateral visual field.

== Background ==
The divided visual field paradigm capitalizes on the lateralization of the visual system. Each cerebral hemisphere only receives information from one half of the visual field—specifically, from the contralateral hemifield. For example, retinal projections from ganglion cells in the left eye that receive information from the left visual field cross to the right hemisphere at the optic chiasm; while information from the right visual field received by the left eye will not cross at the optic chiasm, and will remain on the left hemisphere. Stimuli presented on the right visual field (RVF) will ultimately be processed first by the left hemisphere's (LH) occipital cortex, while stimuli presented on the left visual field (LVF) will be processed first by the right hemisphere's (RH) occipital cortex. Because lateralized visual information is initially segregated between the two cerebral hemispheres, any differences in task performance (e.g., improved response time) between LVF/RVF conditions might be interpreted as differences in the RH or LH's ability to perform the task.

== Methodology ==
To enable the lateralized presentation of visual stimuli, participants' sight must first be fixated at a centralized location, and must be unable to anticipate whether an upcoming stimulus will be presented to the right or left of fixation.

Because the center of the visual field, the fovea, may project bilaterally to both RH and LH, lateralized stimuli should appear sufficiently far from fixation. Researchers recommend that the inside edge of any visual stimulus should be between 2.5° and 3° from central fixation Lateralized stimulus must also be presented very briefly to eliminate the participant's ability to make an eye-movement toward the stimulus (which would result in the stimulus no longer being lateralized, and instead projected to both cerebral hemispheres). Since latency of a saccadic movement towards an unexpected stimulus can be as brief as 150 ms following the stimulus onset, the stimulus should only be presented for a duration of 180 ms at most.

A free software tool called the "Lateralizer" has been developed for piloting and conducting customizable experiments using the divided visual field paradigm.

== Limitations ==
A significant difference between RVF/LH and LVF/RH task performance using the divided visual field paradigm does provide evidence of a functional asymmetry between the two cerebral hemispheres. However, as described by Ivry and Robertson (1998), there are limitations to the types of inferences that can be made from this technique:

These [divided visual field] methods have their limitations. A critical assumption has been that differences in performance with lateralized stimuli nearly always reflect functional differences between the two hemispheres. This is an extremely strong assumption. Researchers have tended to ignore or downplay the fact that asymmetries in brain function cannot be directly observed with these methods. It would require a leap of faith to assume that there is a straightforward mapping between lateralizing a stimulus and producing disproportionate activation throughout the contralateral hemisphere. Normal subjects have an intact corpus callosum, which provides for the rapid transfer of information from one hemisphere to the other.

Visual information can be transferred from one cerebral hemisphere to the other in as little as 3 ms, so any task differences greater than 3 ms may represent asymmetries in neural dynamics that are more complex than a single hemisphere's simple dominance for a particular task. Moreover, the divided visual field technique represents a relatively coarse and indirect method for localizing brain regions associated with cognitive function. Other neuroimaging techniques, including fMRI, PET, and EEG, will provide more spatial resolution, and more direct measures of neural activity. However, these methods are significantly more costly than the divided visual field paradigm.
