= Hemianopsia =

Loss of vision in half the visual field

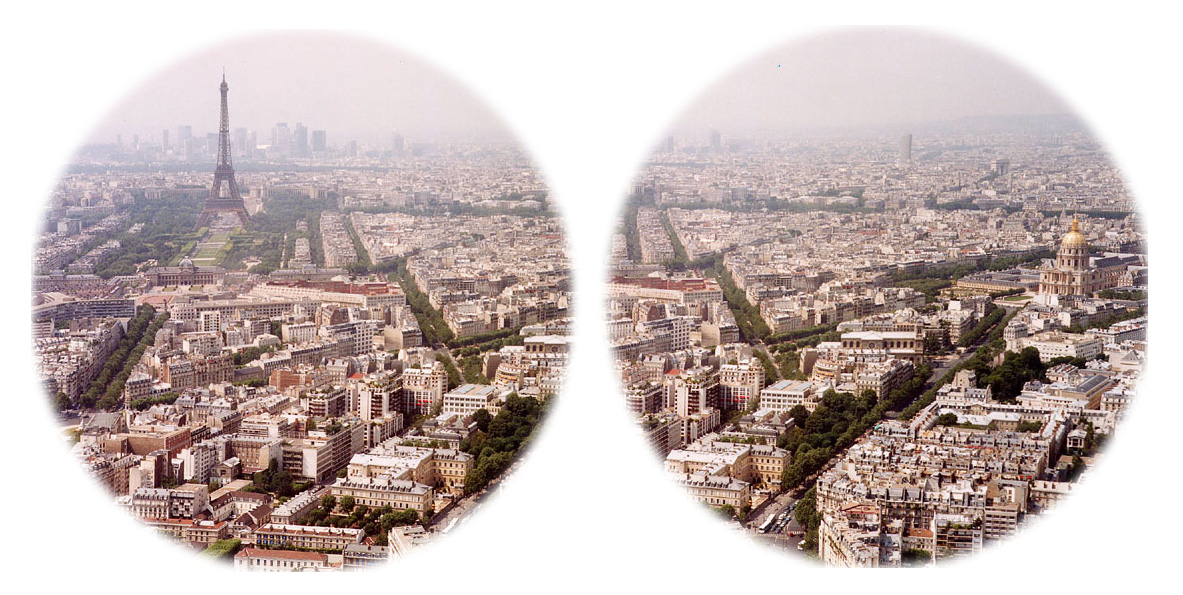
- Paris as seen with full visual fields
- Specialty: Ophthalmology, neurology

Hemianopsia, or hemianopia, is a loss of vision or blindness (anopsia) in half the visual field, usually on one side of the vertical midline. The most common causes of this damage are stroke, brain tumor, and trauma.

This article deals only with permanent hemianopsia, and not with transitory or temporary hemianopsia, as identified by William Wollaston PRS in 1824. Temporary hemianopsia can occur in the aura phase of migraine.

== Etymology ==
The word hemianopsia is from Greek origins, where:

- hemi means "half",
- an means "without", and
- opsia means "seeing".

== Types ==
When the pathology involves both eyes, it is either homonymous or heteronymous.

=== Homonymous hemianopsia ===
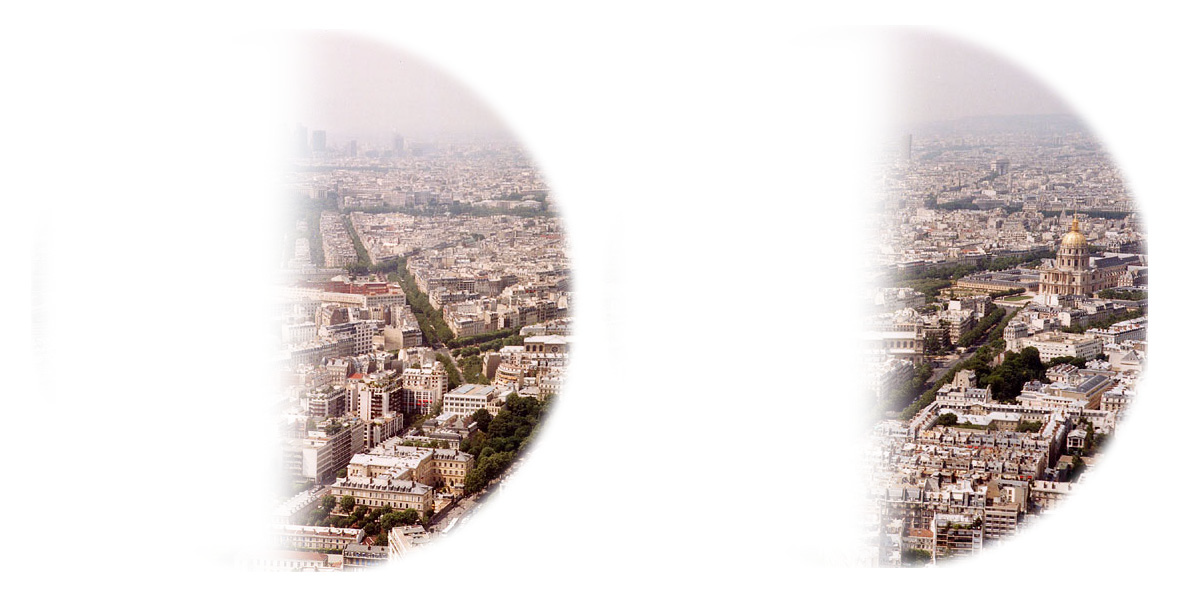
Paris as seen with left homonymous hemianopsia

A homonymous hemianopsia is the loss of half of the visual field on the same side in both eyes. The visual images that we see to the right side travel from both eyes to the left side of the brain, while the visual images we see to the left side in each eye travel to the right side of the brain. Therefore, damage to the right side of the posterior portion of the brain or right optic tract can cause a loss of the left field of view in both eyes. Likewise, damage to the left posterior brain or left optic radiation can cause a loss of the right field of vision.

Paris as seen with right homonymous hemianopsia

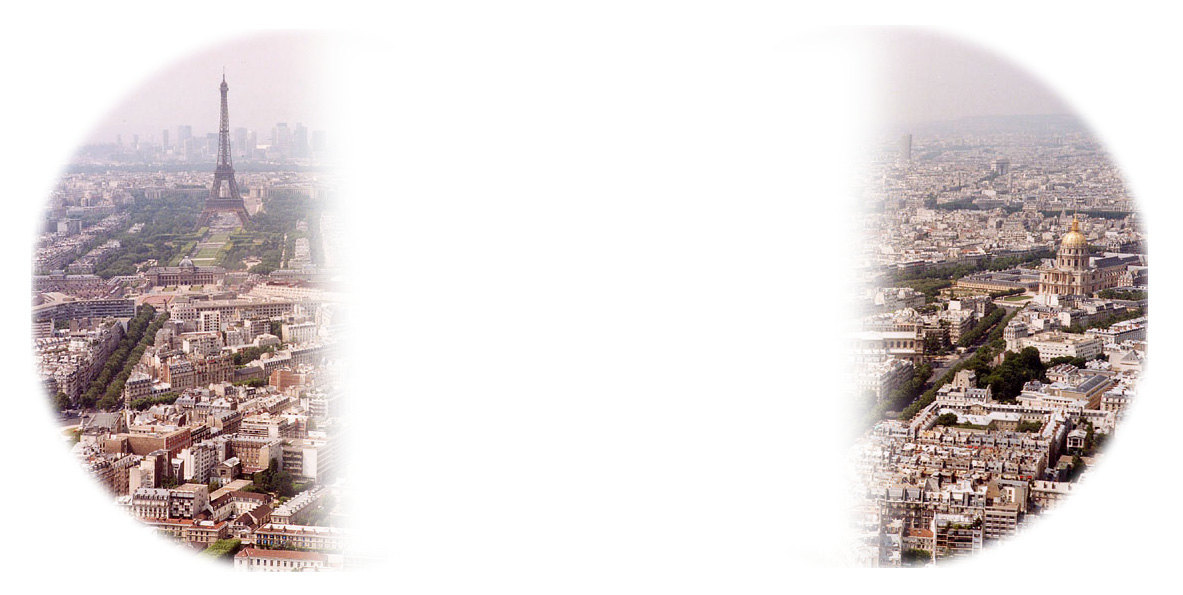
Paris as seen with binasal hemianopsia

=== Heteronymous hemianopsia ===
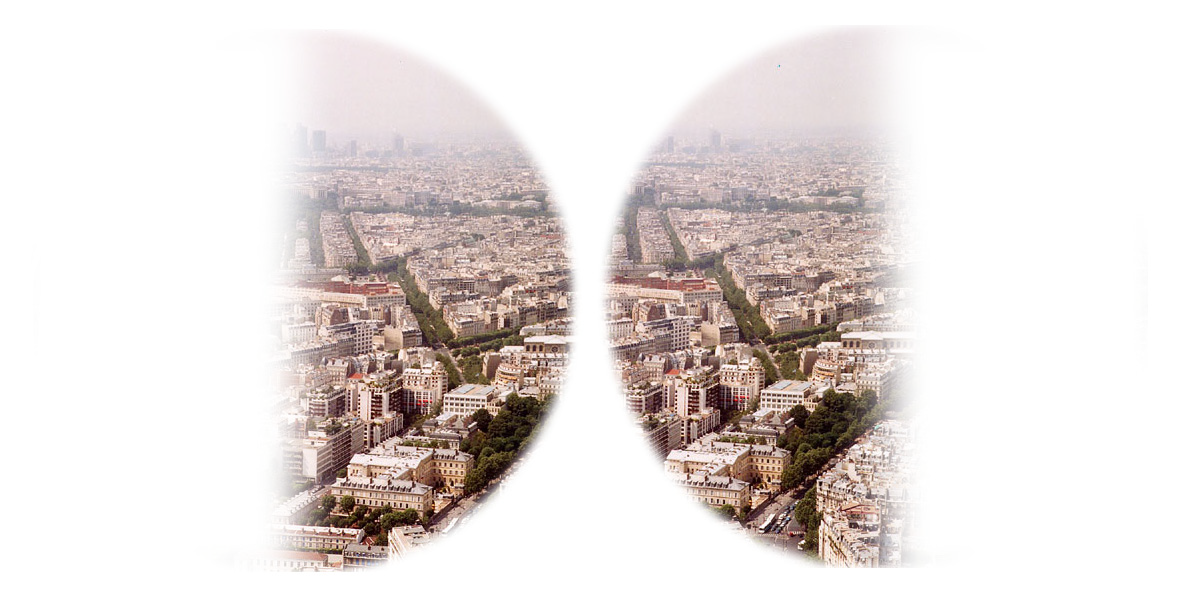
Paris as seen with bitemporal hemianopsia

A heteronymous hemianopsia is the loss of half of the visual field on different sides in both eyes. It is separated into two categories:

- Binasal hemianopsia – the loss of the fields surrounding the nose;
- Bitemporal hemianopsia – the loss of the fields closest to the temples.

=== Other forms ===
- Superior hemianopsia – the upper half of the field of vision is affected, possibly because of a tumor beginning to compress the lower part of the chiasma, typically one from the hypophysis.
- Inferior hemianopsia – the lower half of the field of vision is affected, possibly because of a tumor beginning to compress the upper part of the chiasma, typically a craniopharyngioma.

=== Quadrantanopia ===
Quadrantanopia (quadrantanopsia or quadrantic hemianopsia) is decreased vision or blindness in one quarter of the visual field. The particular quarter of vision missing depends on whether the location of the brain damage is temporal or parietal, and the side of the lesion. For example, a lesion to the right temporal lobe with damage specifically to Meyer's loop will give rise to a left upper (superior) quadrantanopsia, while a lesion to the right parietal radiation with damage specifically to Baum's loop will result in a left lower (inferior) quadrantanopsia.

== Visual neglect ==
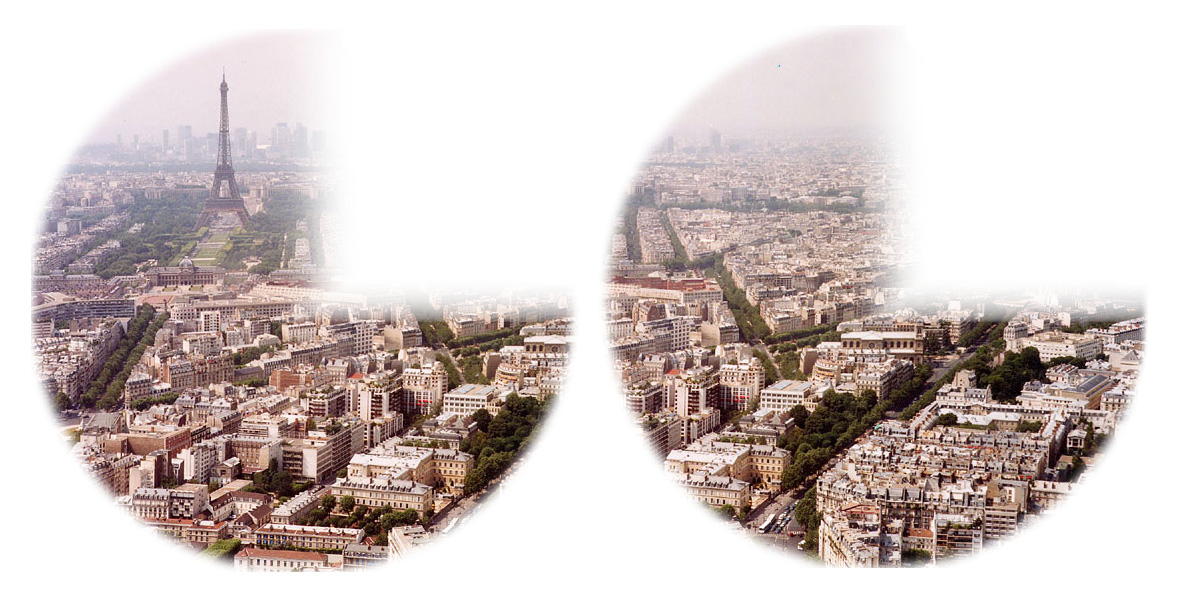
Paris as seen with right homonymous superior quadrantanopia

Visual neglect (also called hemispatial neglect or unilateral spatial neglect) differs from hemianopsia in that it is an attentional deficit rather than a visual one. Unlike patients with hemianopsia who actually don't see, those with visual neglect have no trouble seeing but are impaired in attending to and processing the visual information they receive. Whereas hemianopsia can be assuaged by allowing patients to move their eyes around a visual scene (ensuring that the entire scene makes it into their intact visual field), neglect cannot. Neglect can also apply to auditory or tactile stimuli and can even leave a patient unaware of one side of his or her own body.

Ellis and Young (1998) showed that neglect can also affect patients' mental maps such that if they are asked to picture themselves standing in a familiar location and name the buildings around them, they will neglect to name the buildings on their impaired side but will be able to name them when asked to mentally face the opposite direction.

Some patients with neglect also have hemianopsia, however the two often occur independent of one another.

== Management ==
Some forms of hemianopia can be treated through repeated presentations of multisensory stimuli due to the process of multisensory integration occurring in the superior colliculus.

Surgical interventions have also been shown to ameliorate certain forms of hemianopia due to counterbalancing brain lesions due to a process known as the Sprague effect.
