= Visual field test =

Eye examination that can detect dysfunction in central and peripheral vision

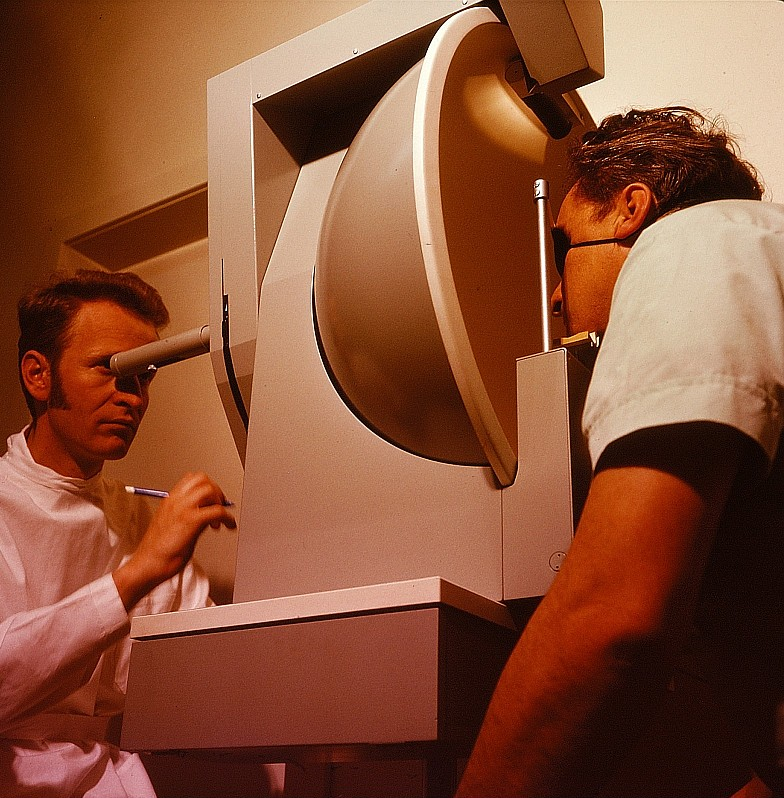
- Taking visual field test using a Goldmann perimeter
- ICD-9-CM: 95.05
- MeSH: D010499
- MedlinePlus: 003879
- LOINC: 28629-4

A visual field test is an eye examination that can detect dysfunction in central and peripheral vision which may be caused by various medical conditions such as glaucoma, stroke, pituitary disease, brain tumours or other neurological deficits. Visual field testing can be performed clinically by keeping the subject's gaze fixed while presenting objects at various places within their visual field. Simple manual equipment can be used such as in the tangent screen test or the Amsler grid. When dedicated machinery is used it is called a perimeter.

The exam may be performed by a technician in one of several ways. The test may be performed by a technician directly, with the assistance of a machine, or completely by an automated machine. Machine-based tests aid diagnostics by allowing a detailed printout of the patient's visual field.

Other names for this test may include perimetry, Tangent screen exam, Automated perimetry exam, Goldmann visual field exam, or brand names such as the Humphrey Field Analyzer, Octopus Perimeter, Optopol perimeter, Olleyes VisuALL, etc.

== Examination methods ==
Techniques used to perform this test include the confrontation visual field examination (Donders' test). The examiner will ask the patient to cover one eye and stare at the examiner. Ideally, when the patient covers their right eye, the examiner covers their left eye and vice versa. The examiner will then move his hand out of the patient's visual field and then bring it back in. Commonly the examiner will use a slowly wagging finger or a hat pin for this. The patient signals the examiner when his hand comes back into view. This is frequently done by an examiner as a simple and preliminary test.

== Perimetry ==
Perimetry or campimetry is one way to systematically test the visual field. It is the systematic measurement of differential light sensitivity in the visual field by the detection of the presence of test targets on a defined background. Perimetry more carefully maps and quantifies the visual field, especially at the extreme periphery of the visual field. The name comes from the method of testing the perimeter of the visual field.

Automated perimeters are used widely, and applications include: diagnosing disease, job selection, visual competence assessment, school or community screenings, military selection, and disability classifications.

=== Types ===
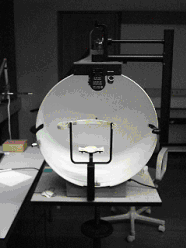
Goldmann Perimeter

Tangent screen
The simplest form of perimetry uses a white tangent screen. Vision is tested by presenting different sized pins attached to a black wand, which may be moved, against a black background. This test stimulus (pins) may be white or colored.
Goldmann perimeter
The Goldmann perimeter is a hollow white spherical bowl positioned a set distance in front of the patient. An examiner presents a test light of variable size and intensity. The light may move towards the center from the perimeter (kinetic perimetry), or it may remain in one location (static perimetry). The Goldmann method is able to test the entire range of peripheral vision and has been used for years to follow vision changes in glaucoma patients. However, now automated perimetry is more commonly used.
Automated perimetry
Automated perimetry uses a mobile stimulus moved by a perimetry machine. The patient indicates whether he sees the light by pushing a button. The use of a white background and lights of incremental brightness is called "white-on-white" perimetry. This type of perimetry is the most commonly used in clinical practice, and in research trials where loss of visual field must be measured. However, the sensitivity of white-on-white perimetry is low, and the variability is relatively high; as many as 25–50 percent of the photoreceptor cells may be lost before changes in visual field acuity are detected. This method is commonly used for early detection of blind spots. The patient sits in front of an (artificial) small concave dome in a small machine with a target in the center. The chin rests on the machine and the eye that is not being tested is covered. A button is given to the patient to be used during the exam. The patient is set in front of the dome and asked to focus on the target at the center. A computer then shines lights on the inside dome and the patient clicks the button whenever a light is seen. The computer then automatically maps and calculates the patient's visual field.
Microperimetry
Microperimetry assesses the macular function in a similar way to perimetry. However, fundus imaging is performed at the same time. This allows for fundus tracking to ensure accurate stimulus placement. Thus, microperimetry provides enhanced retest reliability, enables precise structure-function correlation, and allows for examination of patients with unstable fixation.

== Methods of stimulus presentation ==
=== Static perimetry ===
Static perimetry tests different locations throughout the field one at a time. First, a dim light is presented at a particular location. If the patient does not see the light, it is made gradually brighter until it is seen. The minimum brightness required for the detection of a light stimulus is called the "threshold" sensitivity level of that location. This procedure is then repeated at several other locations, until the entire visual field is tested.

Threshold static perimetry is generally done using automated equipment. It is used for rapid screening and follow-up of diseases involving deficits such as scotomas, loss of peripheral vision and more subtle vision loss. Perimetry testing is important in the screening, diagnosing, and monitoring of various eye, retinal, optic nerve and brain disorders.

=== Kinetic perimetry ===
Kinetic perimetry uses a mobile stimulus moved by an examiner (perimetrist) such as in Goldmann kinetic perimetry. First, a single test light of constant size and brightness is used. The test light is moved towards the center of vision from the periphery until it is first detected by the patient. This is repeated by approaching the center of vision from different directions. Repeating this enough will establish a boundary of vision for that target. The procedure is repeated using different test lights that are larger or brighter than the original test light.

In this way, kinetic perimetry is useful for mapping visual field sensitivity boundaries. It may be a good alternative for patients that have difficulty with automated perimetry, either due to difficulty maintaining constant gaze, or due to cognitive impairment.

== Stimulus settings and photoreceptor-specific perimetry ==
=== Photopic perimetry ===
The most commonly performed perimetry test uses white stimuli on a bright white background (photopic white-on-white testing). This tests isolated L- and M-cone function and is applied in the setting of glaucoma.

=== Scotopic perimetry ===
Following 30 minutes of dark-adaptation, it is possible to selectively test rod function using short-wavelength (blue) stimuli on a dark background. Today, it is also possible to perform this type of examination in eyes with unstable fixation using scotopic microperimetry.

== See also ==
- Bitemporal hemianopsia (loss of peripheral vision).
