= Binasal hemianopsia =

Loss of vision in the inner half of both the right and left visual field

- Other names: Binasal hemianopia
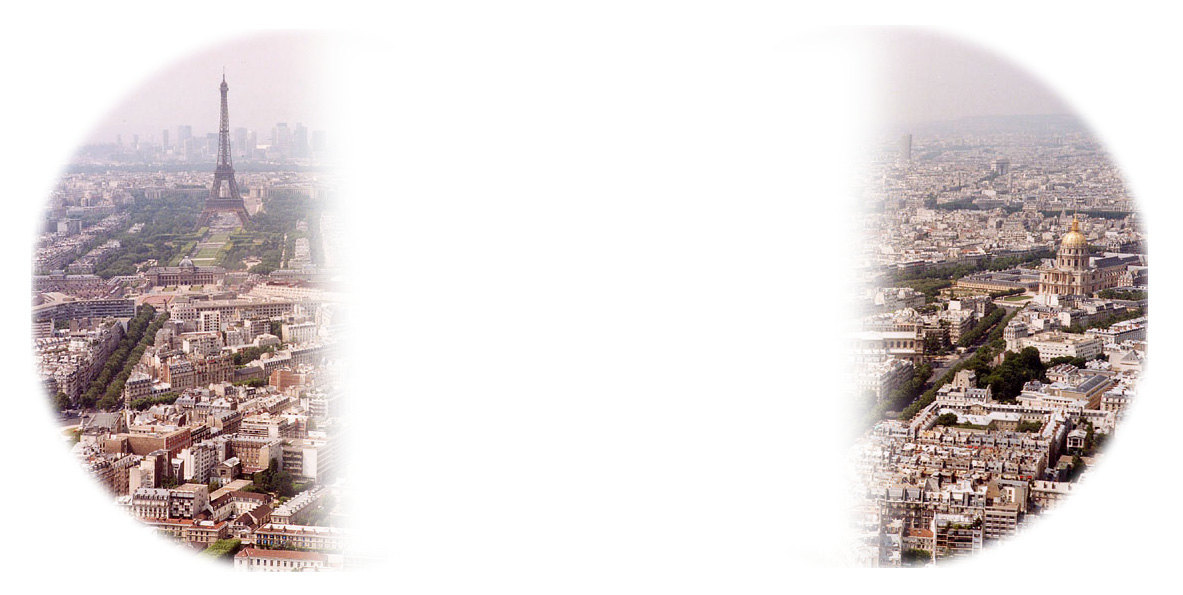
- Paris as seen with binasal hemianopsia
- Specialty: Ophthalmology

Binasal hemianopsia is the medical description of a type of partial blindness where vision is missing in the inner half of both the right and left visual field. It is associated with certain lesions of the eye and of the central nervous system, such as congenital hydrocephalus.

== Causes ==
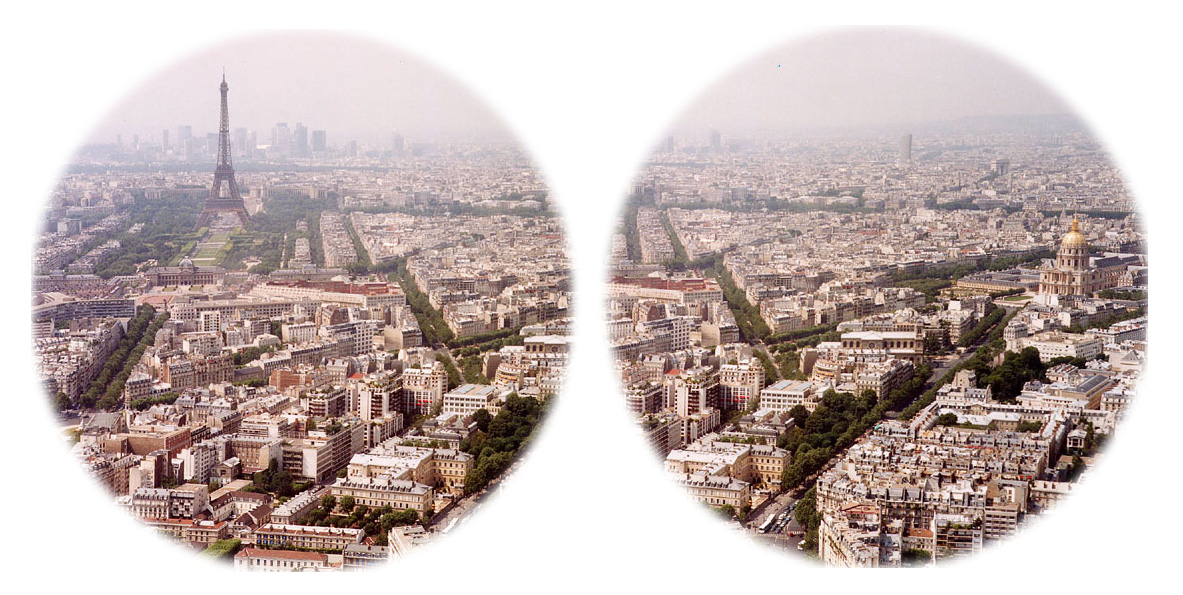
Paris as seen with full visual fields

In binasal hemianopsia, vision is missing in the inner (nasal or medial) half of both the right and left visual fields. Information from the nasal visual field falls on the temporal (lateral) retina. Those lateral retinal nerve fibers do not cross in the optic chiasm. Calcification of the internal carotid arteries can impinge the uncrossed, lateral retinal fibers, leading to loss of vision in the nasal field.

Clinical testing of visual fields (by confrontation) can produce a false positive result, particularly in inferior nasal quadrants.

== Etymology ==
The absence of vision in half of a visual field is described as hemianopsia. The absence of visual perception in one quarter of a visual field is described as quadrantanopsia.

The visual field of each eye can be divided in two vertically, with the outer half being described as temporal or lateral, and the inner half being described as nasal.

"Binasal hemianopsia" can be broken down as follows:

- bi-: involves both left and right visual fields
- nasal: involves the nasal visual field
- hemi-: involves one-half of each visual field
- anopsia: blindness

== See also ==
- Bitemporal hemianopsia
- Homonymous hemianopsia
