= Bitemporal hemianopsia =

Loss of vision in the outer half of both the right and left visual field

- Other names: Bitemporal heteronymous hemianopsia or Bitemporal hemianopia
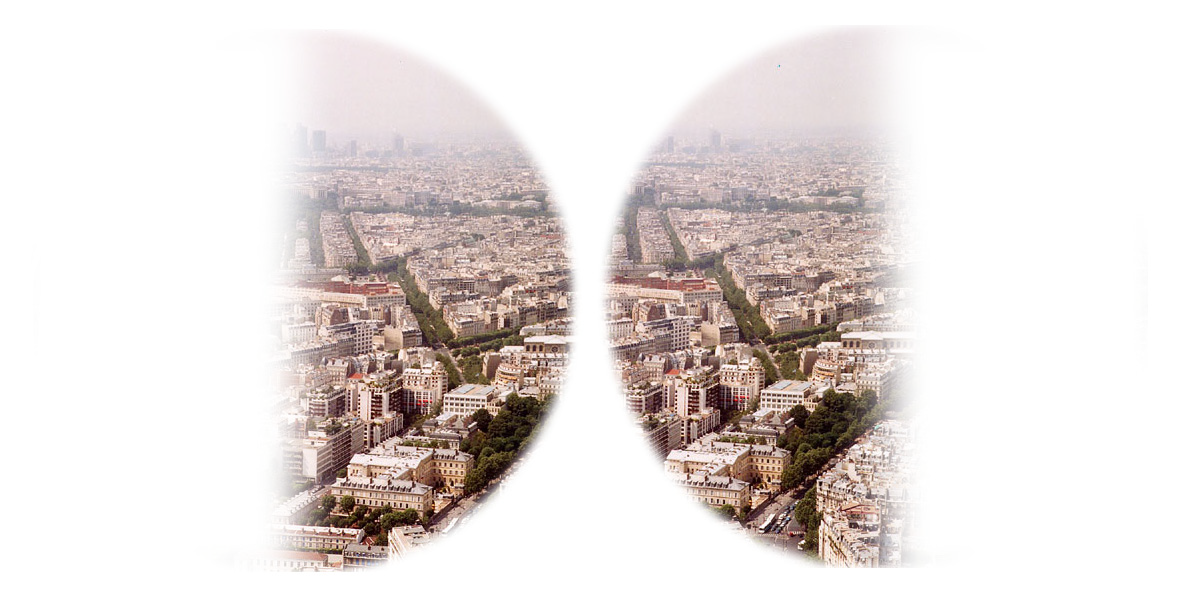
- Specialty: Ophthalmology

Bitemporal hemianopsia is the medical description of a type of partial blindness where vision is missing in the outer half of both the right and left visual field. It is usually associated with lesions of the optic chiasm, the area where the optic nerves from the right and left eyes cross near the pituitary gland.

== Causes ==
In bitemporal hemianopsia, vision is missing in the outer (temporal or lateral) half of both the right and left visual fields. Information from the temporal visual field falls on the nasal (medial) retina. The nasal retina is responsible for carrying the information along the optic nerve, and crosses to the other side at the optic chiasm. When there is compression at the optic chiasm, the visual impulse from both nasal retina are affected, leading to inability to see the temporal, or peripheral, field of vision. This phenomenon is known as bitemporal hemianopsia. Knowing the neurocircuitry of visual signal flow through the optic tract is very important in understanding bitemporal hemianopsia.

Bitemporal hemianopsia most commonly occurs as a result of tumors located at the mid-optic chiasm. Since the adjacent structure is the pituitary gland, some common tumors causing compression are pituitary adenomas and craniopharyngiomas. Also, another relatively common neoplastic cause is meningiomas. A cause of vascular origin is an aneurysm of the anterior communicating artery which arises superior to the chiasm, enlarges, and compresses it from above.

== Etymology ==
The absence of vision in half of a visual field is described as hemianopsia.

The visual field of each eye can be divided in two vertically, with the outer half being described as temporal, and the inner half being described as nasal.

"Bitemporal hemianopsia" can be broken down as follows:

- bi-: involves both left and right visual fields
- temporal: involves the temporal visual field
- hemi-: involves half of each visual field
- anopsia: blindness (formed by a(n) ^{no} + opsis ^{vision} + ia)

== See also ==
- Binasal hemianopsia
- Homonymous hemianopsia
