= Quadrantanopia =

Loss of vision in a quarter of the visual field

- Other names: Quadrant anopia
- Right homonymous superior quadrantanopia. The areas of the field lost in each eye are shown as black areas. This visual field defect is characteristic of damage to Meyer's loop on the left side of the brain.
- Specialty: Ophthalmology

Quadrantanopia (also known as quadrantanopsia) refers to an anopia (loss of vision) affecting a quarter of the visual field.

It can be associated with a lesion of an optic radiation. While quadrantanopia can be caused by lesions in the temporal and parietal lobes of the brain, it is most commonly associated with lesions in the occipital lobe.

== Presentation ==
An interesting aspect of quadrantanopia is that there exists a distinct and sharp border between the intact and damaged visual fields, due to an anatomical separation of the quadrants of the visual field. For example, information in the left half of visual field is processed in the right occipital lobe and information in the right half of the visual field is processed in the left occipital lobe.

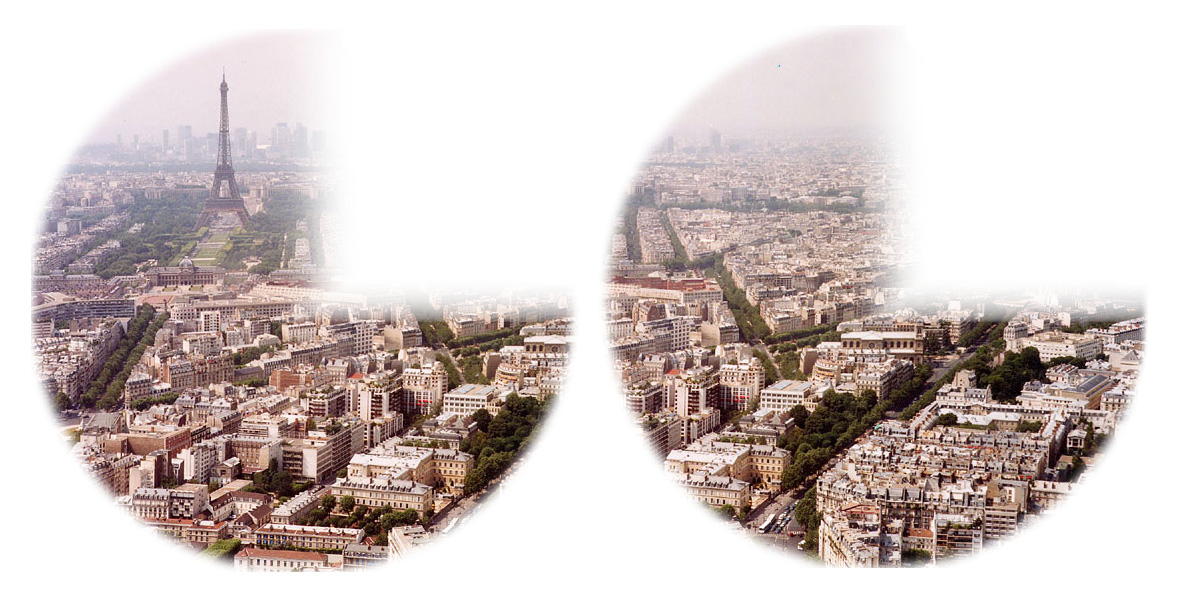
Paris as seen with right homonymous superior quadrantanopia (the so-called "pie in the sky").

In a quadrantanopia that is partial, there also exists a distinct and sharp border between the intact and damaged field within the quadrant. The sufferer is able to detect light within the damaged visual field.

The prospects of recovering vision in the affected field are bleak. Occasionally, patients will spontaneously recover vision in the affected field within the first three months after the brain injury; however, vision loss remaining after this period of spontaneous recovery is traditionally thought to be permanent, certain companies now claim to be able to induce recovery of vision after this three-month period.

== Homonymous inferior/superior quadrantanopia ==
Homonymous denotes a condition which affects the same portion of the visual field of each eye.

Homonymous inferior quadrantanopia is a loss of vision in the same lower quadrant of visual field in both eyes whereas a homonymous superior quadrantanopia is a loss of vision in the same upper quadrant of visual field in both eyes.

A lesion affecting one side of the temporal lobe may cause damage to the inferior optic radiations (known as the temporal pathway or Meyer's loop) which can lead to superior quadrantanopia on the contralateral side of both eyes (colloquially referred to as "pie in the sky"); if the superior optic radiations (parietal pathway or Baum's loop) are lesioned, the visual loss occurs on the inferior contralateral side of both eyes and is referred to as an inferior quadrantanopia (the so called "pie on the floor").

== Binasal/bitemporal quadrantanopia ==
Binasal (either inferior or superior) quadrantanopia, also known as Nerurkarian field defects affects either the upper or lower inner visual quadrants closer to the nasal cavity in both eyes. Bitemporal (either inferior or superior) quadrantanopia affects either the upper or lower outer visual quadrants in both eyes.

== Compensatory behaviors ==
Individuals with quadrantanopia often modify their behavior to compensate for the disorder, such as tilting of the head to bring the affected visual field into view. Drivers with quadrantanopia, who were rated as safe to drive, drive slower, utilize more shoulder movements and, generally, corner and accelerate less drastically than typical individuals or individuals with quadrantanopia who were rated as unsafe to drive. The amount of compensatory movements and the frequency with which they are employed is believed to be dependent on the cognitive demands of the task; when the task is so difficult that the subject's spatial memory is no longer sufficient to keep track of everything, patients are more likely to employ compensatory behavior of biasing their gaze to the afflicted side. Teaching individuals with quadrantanopia compensatory behaviors could potentially be used to help train patients to re-learn to drive safely.
