= Chiasmal syndrome =

Set of signs and symptoms that are associated with lesions of the optic chiasm

Optic chiasm
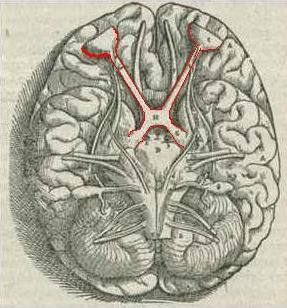
- Visual pathway with optic chiasm (X shape outlined, red) (1543 image from Andreas Vesalius' Fabrica)

Details

Identifiers
- Latin: chiasma opticum
- NeuroLex ID: birnlex_1416

Chiasmal syndrome is the set of signs and symptoms that are associated with lesions of the optic chiasm, manifesting as various impairments of the affected's visual field according to the location of the lesion along the optic nerve. Pituitary adenomas are the most common cause; however, chiasmal syndrome may be caused by cancer, or associated with other medical conditions such as multiple sclerosis and neurofibromatosis.

== Cause ==
Literature divides the causes of chiasmal syndromes into intrinsic and extrinsic causes. Intrinsic implies thickening of the chiasm itself and extrinsic implies compression by another structure. Other less common causes of chiasmal syndrome are metabolic, toxic, traumatic or infectious in nature.

Intrinsic etiologies include gliomas and multiple sclerosis. Gliomas of the optic chiasm are usually derived from astrocytes. These tumors are slow growing and more often found children. However, they have a worse prognosis, especially if they have extended into the hypothalamus. They are frequently associated with neurofibromatosis type 1 (NF-1). Their treatment involves the resection of the optic nerve. The supposed artifactual nature of Wilbrand's knee has implications for the degree of resection that can be obtained, namely by cutting the optic nerve immediately at the junction with the chiasm without fear of potentially resulting visual field deficits.

The vast majority of chiasmal syndromes are compressive. Ruben et al. describe several compressive etiologies, which are important to understand if they are to be successfully managed. The usual suspects are pituitary adenomas, craniopharyngiomas, and meningiomas.

Pituitary tumors are the most common cause of chiasmal syndromes. Visual field defects may be one of the first signs of non-functional pituitary tumor. These are much less frequent than functional adenomas. Systemic hormonal aberrations such as Cushing's syndrome, galactorrhea and acromegaly usually predate the compressive signs. Pituitary tumors often encroach upon the middle chiasm from below. Pituitary apoplexy is one of the few acute chiasmal syndromes. It can lead to sudden visual loss as the hemorrhagic adenoma rapidly enlarges.

The embryonic remnants of Rathke's pouch may undergo neoplastic change called a craniopharyngioma. These tumors may develop at any time but two age groups are most at risk. One peak occurs during the first twenty years of life and the other occurs between fifty and seventy years of age. Craniopharyngiomas generally approach the optic chiasm from behind and above. Extension of craniopharyngiomas into the third ventricle may cause hydrocephalus.

Meningiomas can develop from the arachnoid layer. Tuberculum sellae and sphenoid planum meningiomas usually compress the optic chiasm from below. If the meningioma arises from the diaphragma sellae the posterior chiasm is damaged. Medial sphenoid ridge types can push on the chiasm from the side. Olfactory groove subfrontal types can reach the chiasm from above. Meningiomas are also associated with neurofibromatosis type 1. Women are more prone to develop meningiomas.

== Anatomy ==
The optic chiasm is formed by the union of the two optic nerves. The nasal fibers of each optic nerve decussate (cross) across the chiasm to the contralateral side while the temporal fibers course posteriorly to form the optic tract on the ipsilateral side. This arrangement allows the left half of the visual field to end up on the right side of the brain and the right half of the visual field to locate to the left side.

The optic nerves consist of the axons from the retinal ganglion of each eye. At the chiasm, 53% of the axons from the nasal retina cross the midline to join the uncrossed temporal fibers. These nasal fibers carry information from the temporal visual field. Similarly, the temporal fibers transmit images from the nasal field. The two optic tracts, representing the right and left visual fields, emerge posteriorly from the posterior chiasm. Most of these fibers synapse in the lateral geniculate nucleus or the pretectal nucleus.

The crossing of the nasal half of macular fibers of central vision occurs posteriorly in the chiasm. The inferior and superior fibers remain inferior or superior, respectively. However, the inferonasal fibers pass more anteriorly in the chiasm while the superonasal fibers pass more posteriorly. Classical teaching was that, once crossed, the inferonasal fibers briefly loop back into the contralateral optic nerve sheath, before returning to the chiasm. This bend into the contralateral optic nerve had been called Wilbrand's knee. However, today there is significant evidence that Wilbrand's knee is simply an artifact (error). Optic nerve axons from one eye can only be selectively studied in the human after enucleation of the contralateral eye and thus degeneration of the axons on one side. After several years, the occurring optic nerve atrophy results in artifactual looping of the axons into the atrophic nerve. This looping was initially described by Wilbrand, who studied subjects with severe optic nerve atrophy after enucleation, and who then appears to have exaggerated the importance of this looping in later drawings. Clinically, no optic field deficits have been observed in a small series of optic nerve sections at the optic nerve-chiasm junction.

Several important structures are located adjacent to the optic chiasm. The supraclinoid branches of the internal carotid artery flank the chiasm. The cavernous sinuses are lateral and inferior to the chiasm. The frontal lobe of the brain lies above. The pituitary gland sits below in the sella turcica. The sella turcica is bound in front by the tuberculum sellae and behind by the dorsum sellae. Behind the chiasm lies the floor of the third ventricle.

== Pathophysiology ==
Andrew G. Lee has divided optic chiasmal syndromes into anterior, middle and posterior locations. Anterior chiasmal syndrome affects the junction of the optic nerve and chiasm. Middle chiasmal syndrome relates to the decussating fibers in the body of the optic chiasm while posterior chiasmal syndrome involves the caudal fibers.

The classic anterior chiasmal lesion affects the optic nerve fibers and the contralateral inferonasal fibers located in Wilbrand's knee. This will produce an ipsilateral optic neuropathy, often manifested as a central scotoma, and a defect involving the contralateral superotemporal field. This is also known as a junctional scotoma. An alternative explanation for the contralateral field deficit has been provided by Horton.

Middle lesions affecting the uncrossed temporal fibers are rare. These can result in a nasal or binasal hemianopia. Lesions in the body of the chiasm most commonly disrupt the crossing nasal retinal fibers. This leads to a bitemporal hemianopia. The field of vision may still be full when both eyes are open but stereovision will not be possible. However, if fusion of the images is lost, perhaps due to a preexisting phoria, binocular diplopia may result.

Because macular fibers cross more posteriorly in the chiasm, they are damaged in posterior chiasmal syndrome. This leads to a smaller, paracentral bitemporal field loss. Because the temporal macular fibers have not been damaged, it is possible to preserve color vision and visual acuity. Posterior lesions may also involve the optic tract and cause a contralateral homonymous hemianopia.

Optic disc pallor may be apparent with an ophthalmoscope if the result is longstanding. If the lesion does not affect the lateral uncrossed fibers, the pallor may take on a bow-tie configuration. This is due to loss of retinal ganglion cells nasal to the macula in the papillomacular bundle. Compressive lesions often cause headache and may compress the third ventricle leading to hydrocephalus. The most common tumors also cause pituitary gland malfunction.

== Management ==
Visual fields associated with chiasmal syndrome usually leads to an MRI. Contrast can delineate arterial aneurysms and will enhance most intrinsic chiasmal lesions. If a mass is confirmed on MRI, an endocrine panel can help determine if a pituitary adenoma is involved.

In patients with functional adenomas diagnosed by other means, visual field tests are a good screen to test for chiasmal involvement. Visual fields tests will delineate chiasmal syndromes because the missing fields will not cross the midline. Junctional scotomas classically show ipsilateral optic disc neuropathy with contralateral superotemporal defects. Bitemporal hemianopia with or without central scotoma is present if the lesions have affected the body of the chiasm. A posterior chiasm lesion should only produce defects on the temporal sides of the central visual field.
