= Positive visual phenomena =

Lesions in the visual pathway affect vision most often by creating deficits or negative phenomena, such as blindness, visual field deficits or scotomas, decreased visual acuity and color blindness. On occasion, they may also create false visual images, called positive visual phenomena. These images can be a result of distortion of incoming sensory information leading to an incorrect perception of a real image called an illusion. When the visual system produces images which are not based on sensory input, they can be referred to as hallucinations. The visual phenomena may last from brief moments to several hours, but they also can be permanent. They are generally associated with other symptoms but occasionally are isolated. Conditions causing these phenomena include disruptions in the visual input along the pathways (retina, optic nerve, chiasmal and retrochiasmal lesions) lesions in the extracortical visual system, migraines, seizures, toxic-metabolic encephalopathy, psychiatric conditions and sleep apnea, among others. The mechanisms underlying positive visual phenomena are not yet well understood. Possible mechanisms may be: 1) defect in the sensory input causing compensatory upregulation of the visual cortex, 2) faulty visual processing in which inputs are normal but lesions result in an inappropriate pattern of cortical excitation, 3)variants of normal visual processing. Of all forms of hallucination, visual hallucinations are the least likely to be associated with psychiatric disorders. For example most patients with visual hallucinations do not have schizophrenia and most patients with schizophrenia do not have visual hallucinations.

== Classification ==
=== Illusions ===
As described above, illusions can consist in a misinterpretation of a real sensory input, such as a recurrence, persistence, duplication or change in the size of images.

==== Palinopsia ====
A persistence of a visual image of an object in time after the actual object has disappeared. There are two forms of palinopsia, an immediate and a delayed type. In the immediate type the image continually persists in the visual field after actually disappearing. On the other hand, in the delayed type, the image reappears after an interval of minutes to hours after disappearing. The pathophysiology of palinopsia remains unclear. The immediate type may be an exaggeration of the afterimage whereas the delayed type may indicate that there is cerebral involvement, such as an ictal manifestation or a structural lesion, but has also been shown to be inducible by drugs. The differential diagnosis includes toxins, metabolic disorders and psychiatric conditions.

==== Polyopia ====
A rare illusion characterized by monocular diplopia, excluding refractive abnormalities. When this occurs at the cortical level, this pathophysiology is not well understood.

==== Dysmetropsia (Micro/Macropsia) ====
The illusion that objects are smaller/larger than in reality. Retinal dysmetropsia is the most common type; however, migraine related dysmetropsia may be more common than appreciated. Unusual causes include cortex lesions and seizures.

==== Metamorphopsia ====
The illusion that objects are distorted. As in dysmetropsia, the retinal methamorphopsia is the more common type, although it has been described with seizures and temporo-occipital lesions.

=== Hallucinations ===
Hallucination is defined as visual perception without external stimulation. It must be distinguished whether the individual is able to recognize that the perception is not real, also called pseudo-hallucination, or that the individual endorses it as real, also called delusion. It is only delusion that has serious psychiatric implications. The content of hallucinations is widely variable and can range from simple images including flashing or steady spots, colored lines and shapes (unformed hallucinations) to vivid objects, flowers, animals and persons (formed hallucinations). The differential diagnosis includes entopic phenomena, which are visual images produced within the eye and reflected to the retina. Frequent causes of hallucination include release phenomena (due to impairment of vision) such as Charles Bonnet Syndrome.
