= Peli Lens =

Assistive device

The Peli Lens is a mobility aid for people with homonymous hemianopia. It is also known as “EP” or Expansion Prism concept and was developed by Dr. Eli Peli of Schepens Eye Research Institute in 1999. It expands the visual field by 20 degrees. He tested this concept on several patients in his private practice with great success using 40Δ Fresnel press-on prisms (Peli 2000). Development of the lens and clinical trials were funded by NEI-NIH Grant EY014723 awarded to Chadwick Optical. The results of the multi-center clinical trials were published in 2008 reporting a 74% patient acceptance rate. Under this grant Chadwick Optical also designed and produced a cosmetically acceptable permanent version of this concept in a prescription lens.

An improved version of the Peli Lens expanding the visual field by 30 degrees is available. Clinical trial results are pending.
