= Sprague effect =

The Sprague effect is the phenomenon where homonymous hemianopia, caused by damage to the visual cortex, gets slightly better when the contralesional superior colliculus is destroyed. The effect is named for its discoverer, James Sprague, who observed this phenomenon in 1966 using a cat model. Several reasons have been thought of for this happening, including mutual inhibition between the two brain hemispheres. For similar reasons of inhibiting an inhibitory structure, damaging the substantia nigra, for instance by using ibotenic acid, can also cause the same improvement.
