= Wilbrand's knee =

Anatomical landmark of the optic nerve

Wilbrand's knee: Inferonasal fibres of the optic nerve which go into the contralateral optic nerve 4 mm before crossing over to the opposite optic tract. A lesion here produces a junctional scotoma in the superior temporal field of the optic nerve opposite the site of injury.

== See also ==
- Hermann Wilbrand
