= Vision restoration therapy =

Vision restoration therapy (VRT) is a noninvasive form of vision therapy which claims to increase the size of the visual fields in those with hemianopia. It, however, is of unclear benefit as of 2017 and is not part of standardized treatment approaches.

== Description of therapy ==
Vision restoration therapy (VRT) is a computer-based treatment which claims to help with visual field defects regain visual functions through repetitive light stimulation.

As the device used in VRT is similar to the DynaVision 2000 that already exist the Food and Drug Administration (FDA) allowed an indication for use "...the diagnosis and improvement of visual functions in patients with impaired vision that may result from trauma, stroke, inflammation, surgical removal of brain tumors or brain surgery, and may also be used to improve visual function in patients with amblyopia".
