= Optic tract =

Neural pathway within the human visual system

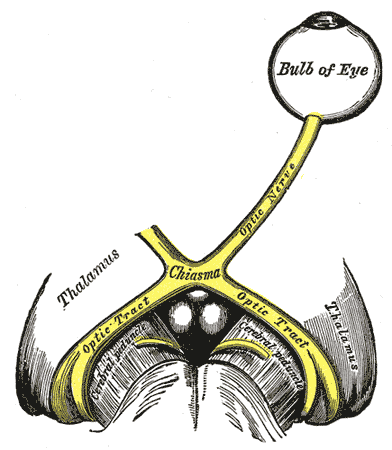
- The left optic nerve and the optic tracts.

Details
- Part of: Visual system

Identifiers
- Latin: tractus opticus
- MeSH: D065866
- NeuroNames: 460
- NeuroLex ID: birnlex_1684
- TA98: A14.1.08.404
- TA2: 5669
- FMA: 62046

In neuroanatomy, the optic tract (from Latin tractus opticus) is a part of the visual system in the brain. It is a continuation of the optic nerve that relays information from the optic chiasm to the ipsilateral lateral geniculate nucleus (LGN), pretectal nuclei, and superior colliculus.

It is composed of two individual tracts, the left optic tract and the right optic tract, each of which conveys visual information exclusive to its respective contralateral half of the visual field. Each of these tracts is derived from a combination of temporal and nasal retinal fibers from each eye that corresponds to one half of the visual field. In more specific terms, the optic tract contains fibers from the ipsilateral temporal hemiretina and contralateral nasal hemiretina.

== Anatomy ==
=== Arterial supply ===
The optic tract receives arterial supply from the anterior choroidal artery, and posterior communicating artery.

== Function ==
=== Visual function ===
The optic tract carries retinal information relating to the whole visual field. Specifically, the left optic tract corresponds to the right visual field, while the right optic tract corresponds to the left visual field. To form the right visual field, temporal retinal fibers from the left eye and nasal retinal fibers from the right eye form the left optic tract, and to form the left visual field, temporal retinal fibers from the right eye and nasal retinal fibers from the left eye form the right optic tract.

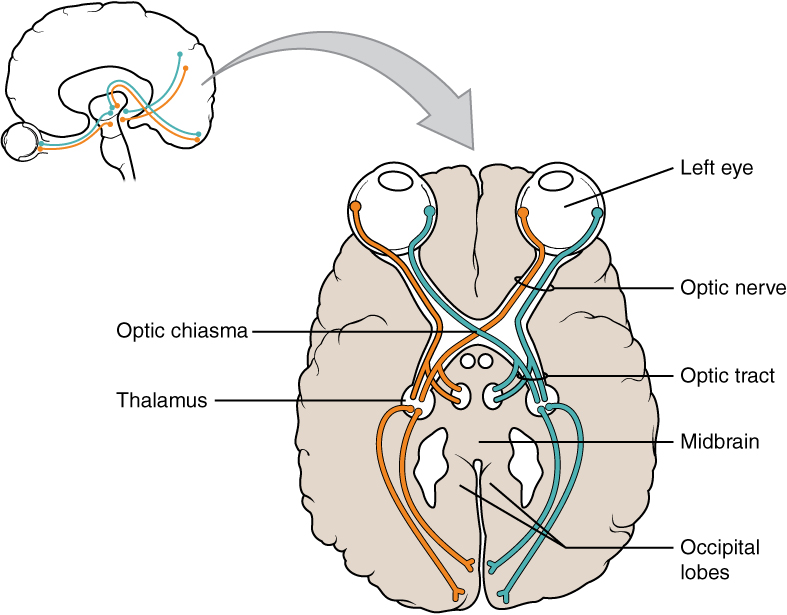
In this schematic, red fibers represent nerves innervating the right visual field and blue fibers indicate nerves innervating the left visual field

Optic Tract	Visual Field	Temporal Retinal Fibers	Nasal Retinal Fibers
Left	Right	Left	Right
Right	Left	Right	Left

=== Autonomic function ===
Several autonomic ocular motor responses are consensual. The optic tract is primarily responsible for relaying visual information to the LGN, but it is also peripherally responsible for transducing these bilateral autonomic reflexes, including the pupillary light reflex and pupillary dark reflex.

==== Pupillary light reflex ====
The pupillary light reflex is an autonomic reflex that controls pupil diameter to accommodate for increases in illumination as perceived by the retina. Higher light intensity causes pupil constriction, and the increase of light stimulation of one eye will cause pupillary constriction of both eyes. The neural circuitry of the pupillary light reflex includes the optic tract which joins the optic nerve to the brachium of the superior colliculus.

==== Pupillary dark reflex ====
Similarly to the pupillary light reflex, the pupillary dark reflex is an autonomic reflex that controls pupil diameter to accommodate for decreases in illumination as perceived by the retina. Lower light intensity causes pupil dilation, and the decrease of light stimulation of one eye will cause pupillary dilation of both eyes. Similarly, the neural circuitry of the pupillary dark reflex includes the optic tract which joins the optic nerve to the hypothalamus.

== Damage and pathologies ==
=== Lesions ===
Lesions in the optic tract correspond to visual field loss on the left or right half of the vertical midline, also known as homonymous hemianopsia. A lesion in the left optic tract will cause right-sided homonymous hemianopsia, while a lesion in the right optic tract will cause left-sided homonymous hemianopsia. Stroke, congenital defects, tumors, infection, and surgery are all possible causes of optic tract damage. Peripheral prism expanders and vision restitution therapy may be employed in patients with visual field loss resultant of permanent optic tract damage.

=== Split-brain ===
In certain split-brain patients who have undergone a corpus callosotomy to treat severe epilepsy, the information from one optic tract does not get transmitted to both hemispheres. For instance, a split-brain patient shown an image in the left visual field will be unable to vocally name what has been seen as the speech-control center is in the left hemisphere of the brain.

=== Pupillary reflexes ===
Pupillary reflexes, particularly the pupillary light reflex, are a powerful diagnostic tool often employed in clinical and emergency medical practice. A lack of equal consensual pupillary constriction to a light stimulus, especially a Marcus Gunn pupil, can be indicative of optic nerve damage, brainstem death, or optic tract damage in between.

== Additional images ==
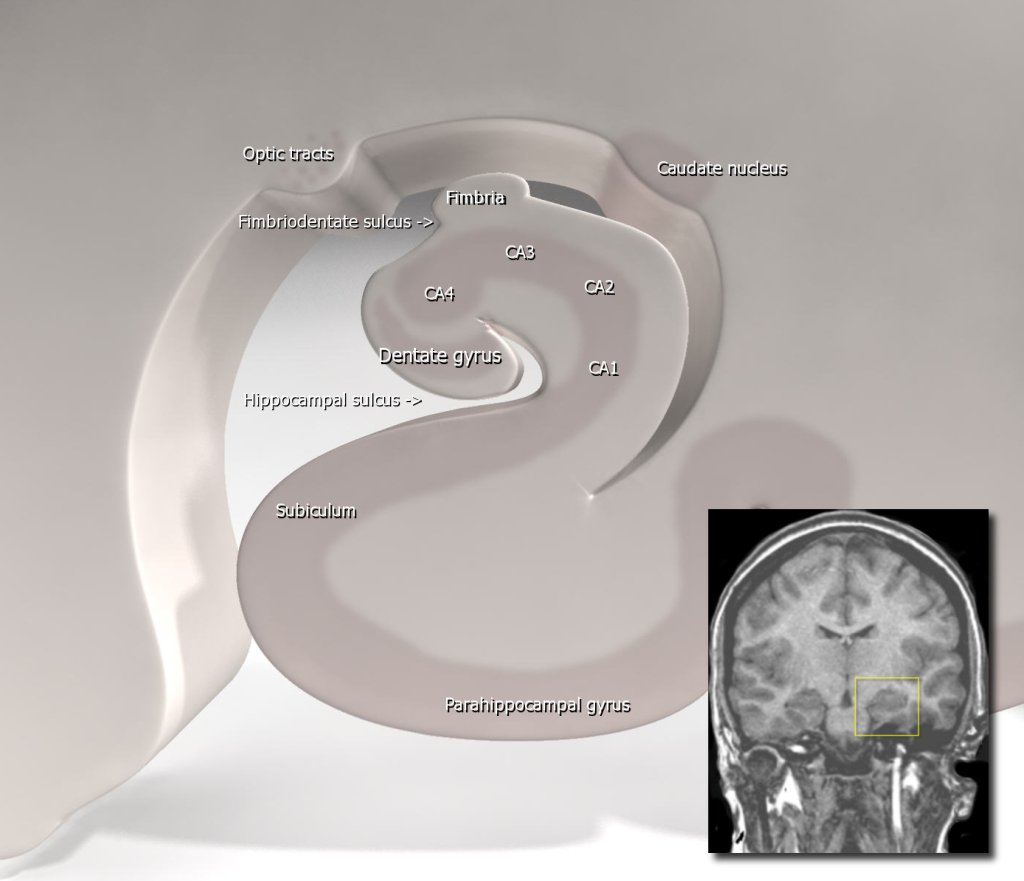
Diagram of hippocampus

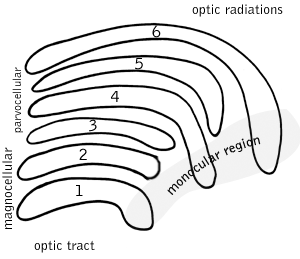
Schematic diagram of the primate lateral geniculate nucleus.

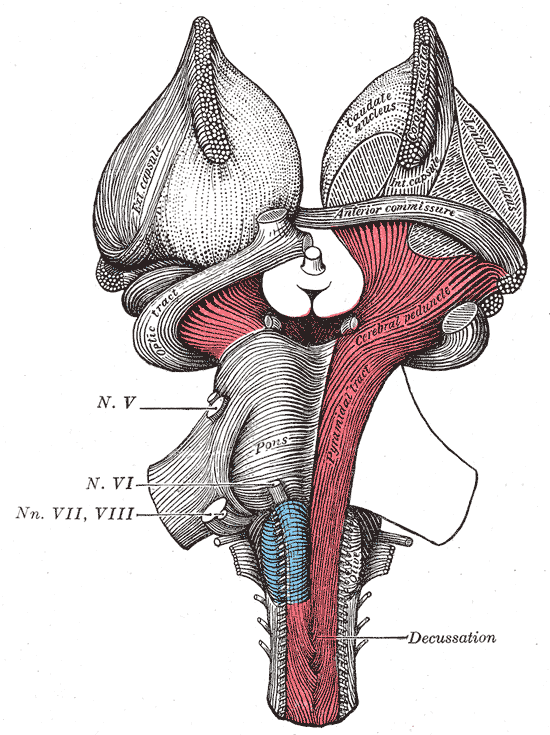
Superficial dissection of brain-stem. Ventral view.

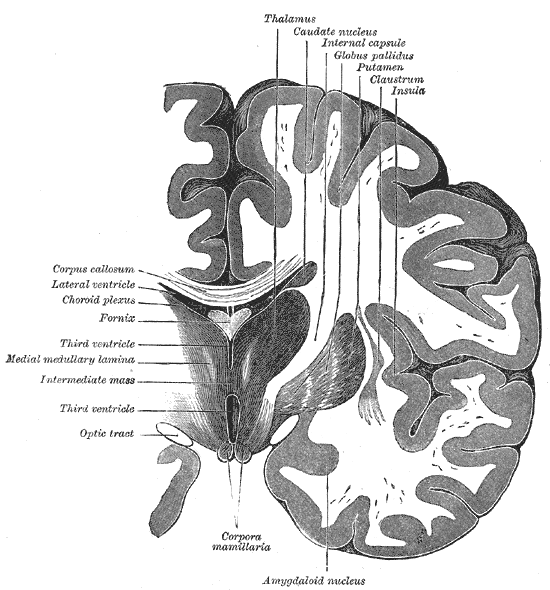
Coronal section of brain through intermediate mass of third ventricle.

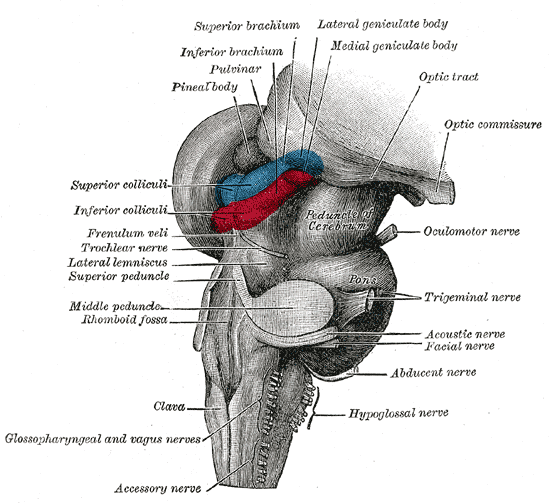
Hind- and mid-brains; postero-lateral view.

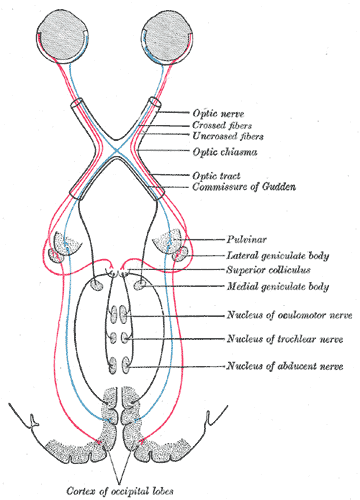
Scheme showing central connections of the optic nerves and optic tracts.

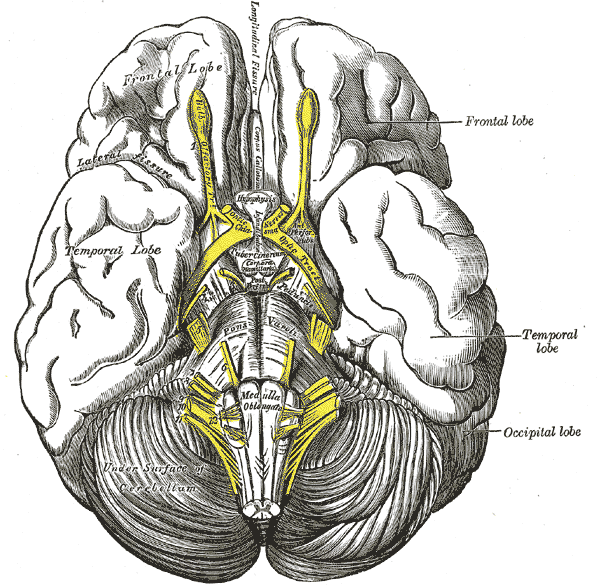
Base of brain.

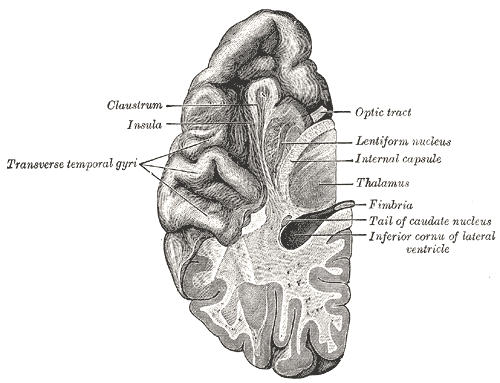
Section of brain showing upper surface of temporal lobe.

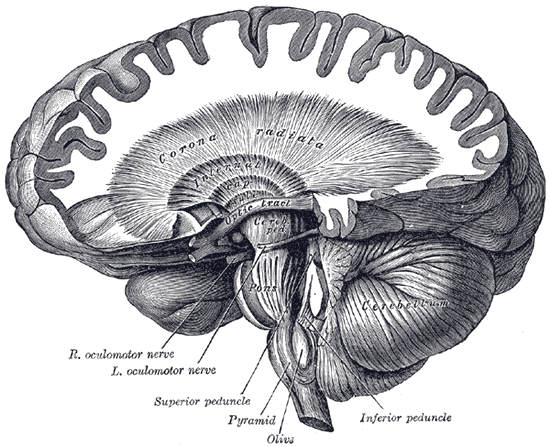
Dissection showing the course of the cerebrospinal fibers.

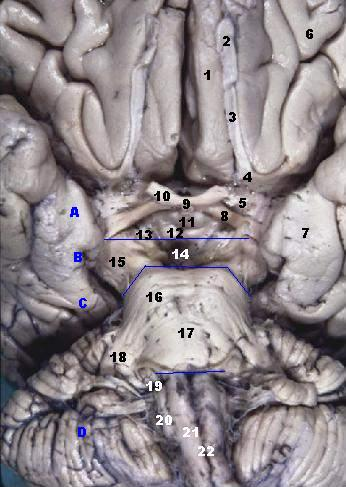
Human brainstem anterior view

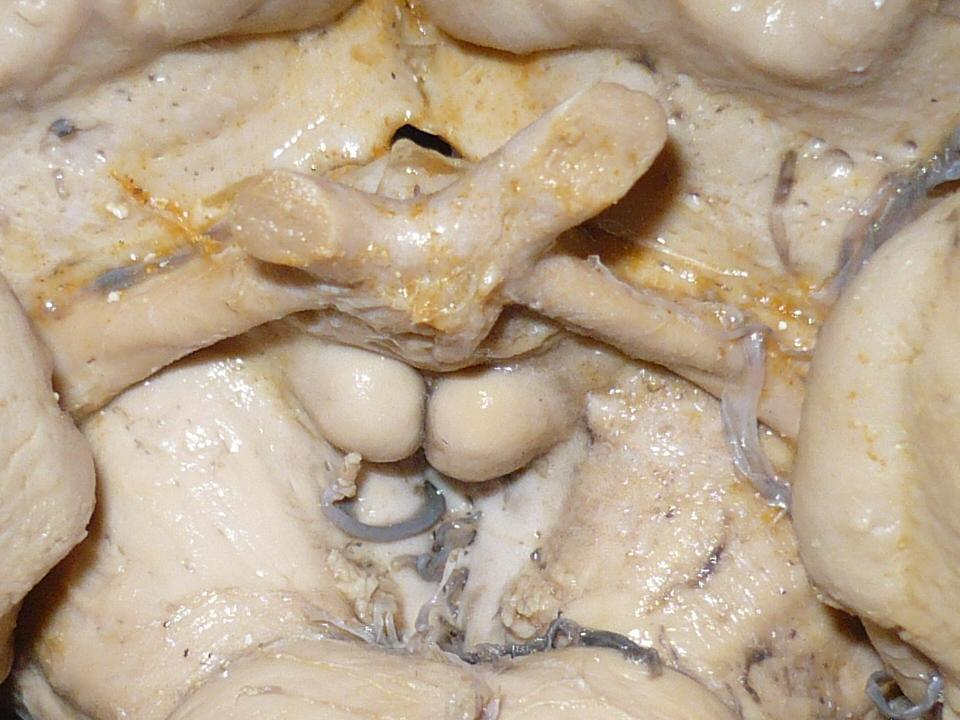
Optic tract and optic nerve

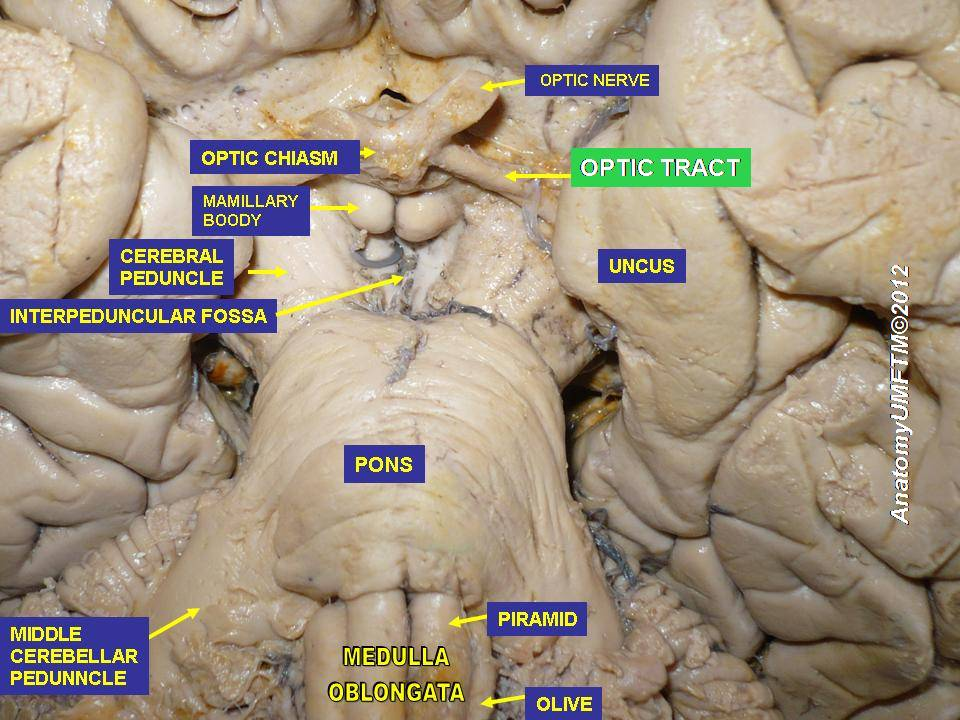
Optic tract

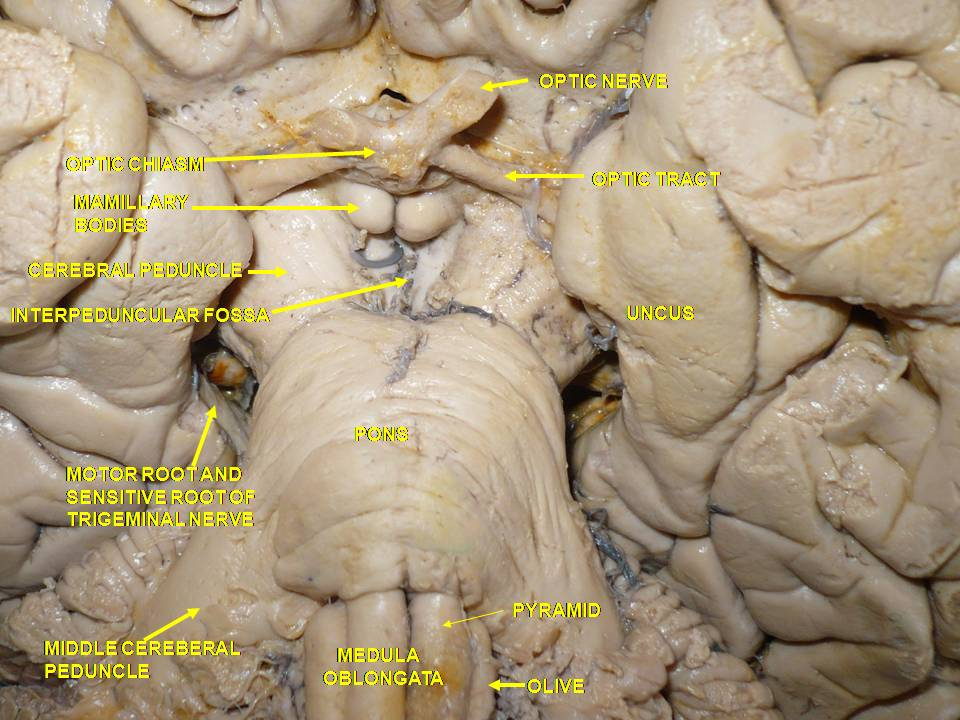
Cerebrum. Deep dissection. Inferior dissection.

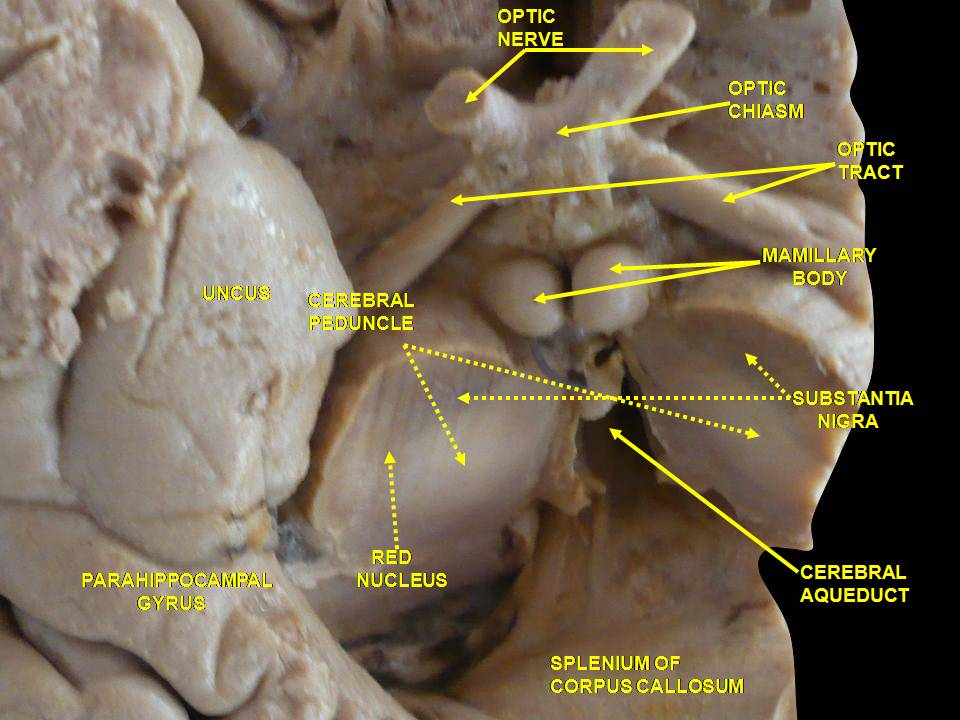
Cerebral peduncle, optic chasm, cerebral aqueduct. Inferior view. Deep dissection.

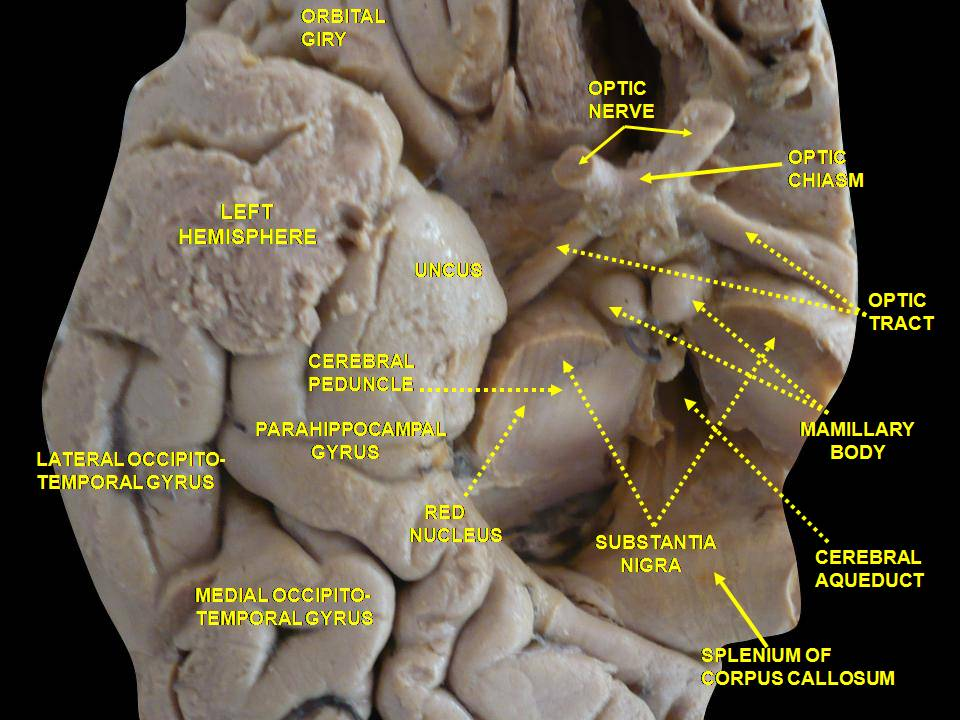
Cerebral peduncle, optic chasm, cerebral aqueduct. Inferior view. Deep dissection.

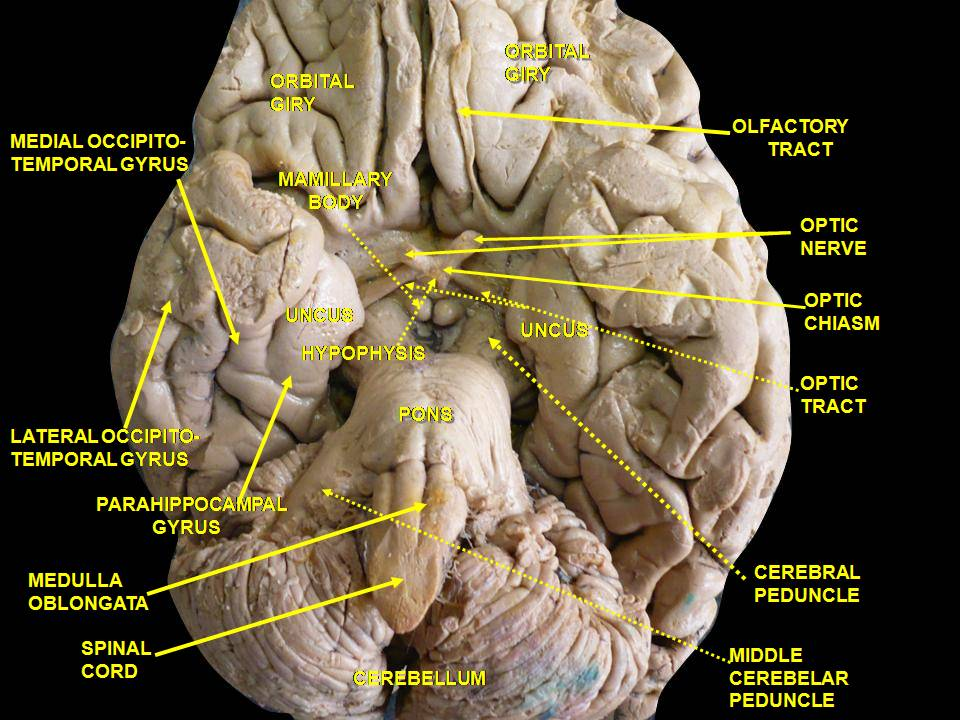
Cerebrum.Inferior view.Deep dissection.

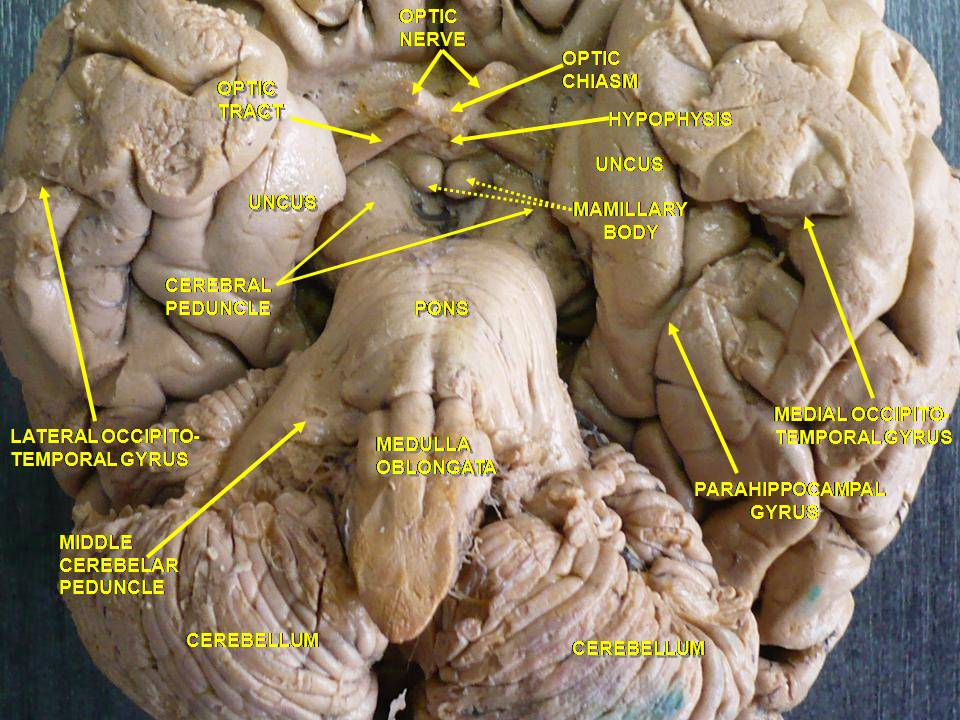
Cerebrum.Inferior view.Deep dissection.

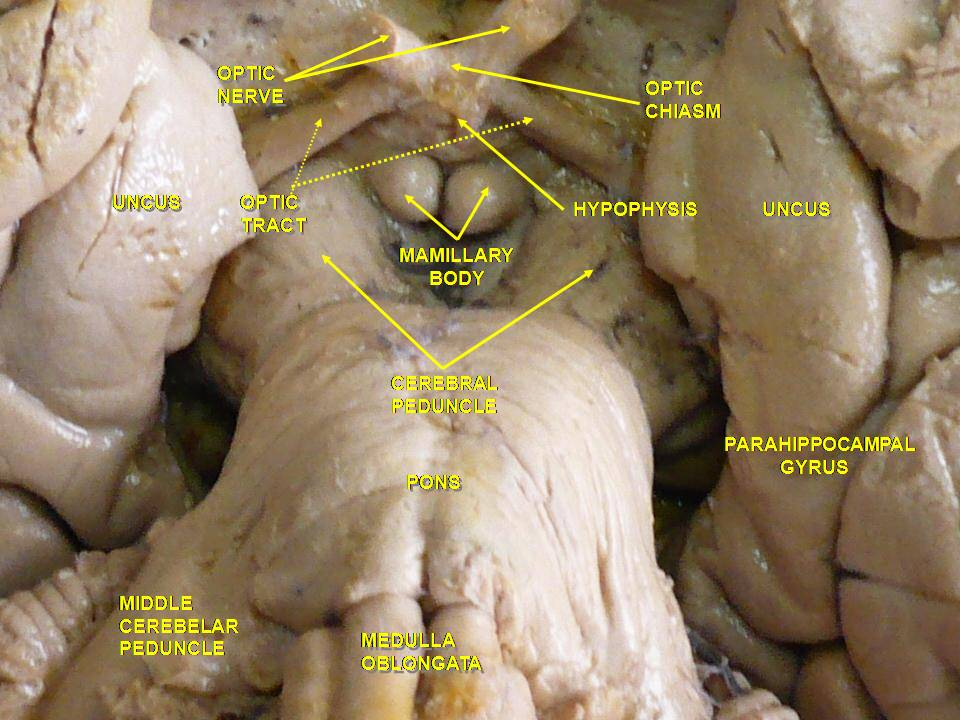
Cerebrum.Inferior view.Deep dissection.

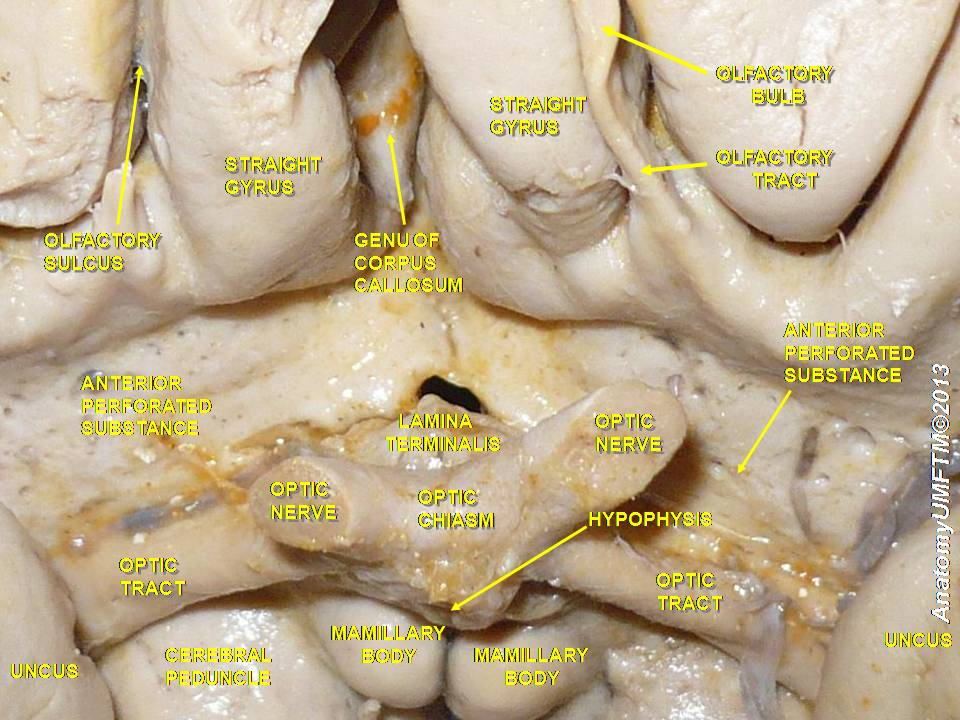
Cerebrum. Inferior view.Deep dissection

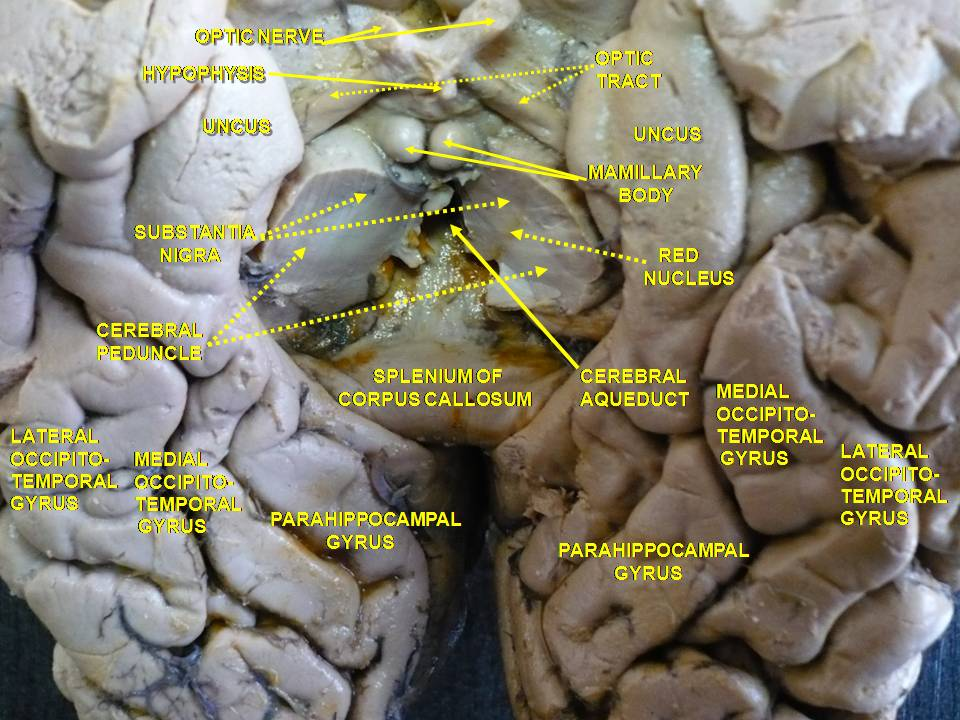
Cerebrum. Inferior view.Deep dissection

== See also ==
- Optic nerve (CN II)
- Ophthalmic nerve (CN V_{1})
- Bistratified cell
- Optic radiation
