= Homonymous hemianopsia =

Visual field loss on the left or right side of the vertical midline

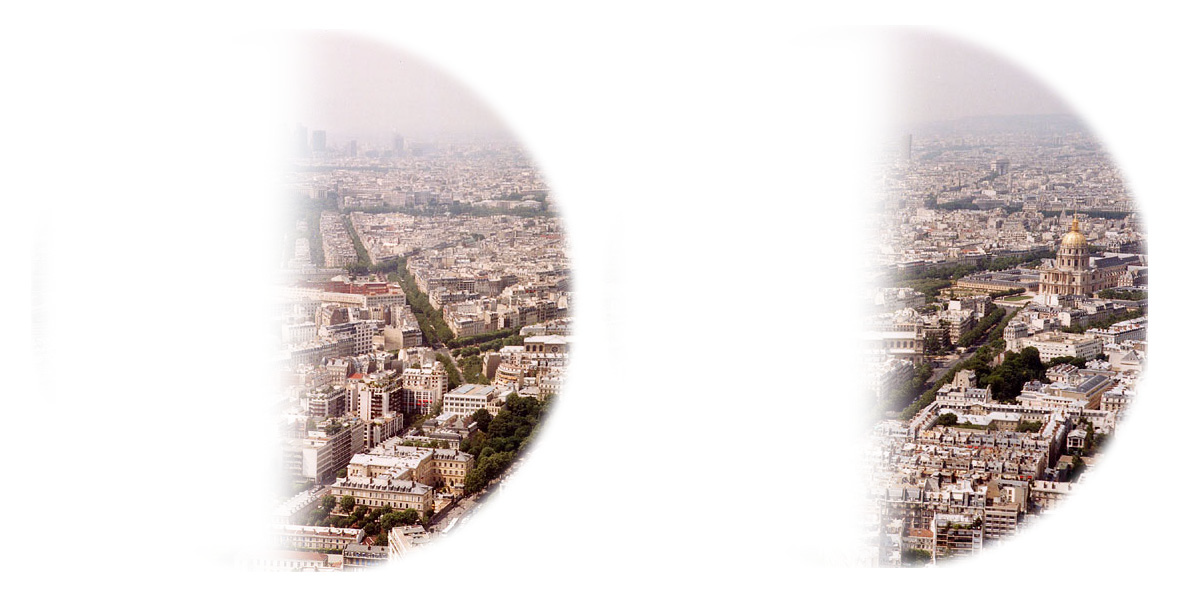
- Paris as seen with left homonymous hemianopsia
- Specialty: Ophthalmology
- Symptoms: Clumsiness, decreased night visions, difficulty of straight line walking, distorted sight, doubled vision, frequent turning of the head away from the side where it's present, lack of awareness where it's present, visual hallucinations
- Causes: Brain bleed, brain inflammation, brain tumor, dementia, epilepsy, lymphoma, other kinds of brain injuries, and stroke
- Diagnostic method: Magnetic resonance imaging

Hemianopsia, or hemianopia, is a visual field loss on the left or right side of the vertical midline. It can affect one eye but usually affects both eyes.

Homonymous hemianopsia (or homonymous hemianopia) is hemianopic visual field loss on the same side of both eyes. Homonymous hemianopsia occurs because the right half of the brain has visual pathways for the left hemifield of both eyes, and the left half of the brain has visual pathways for the right hemifield of both eyes. When one of these pathways is damaged, the corresponding visual field is lost.

== Signs and symptoms ==
Paris as seen with right homonymous hemianopsia

Mobility can be difficult for people with homonymous hemianopsia. "Patients frequently complain of bumping into obstacles on the side of the field loss, thereby bruising their arms and legs."

People with homonymous hemianopsia often experience discomfort in crowds. "A patient with this condition may be unaware of what he or she cannot see and frequently bumps into walls, trips over objects or walks into people on the side where the visual field is missing."

A related phenomenon is hemispatial neglect, the possible neglect of the right or left. The patient is not conscious of its existence. The right side of the face is not shaven, make up is applied to one side of the face only and only half of a plate of food is eaten. This, however, is not necessarily due to a sensory abnormality, and is therefore distinct from hemianopsia.

== Causes ==
Homonymous hemianopsia can be congenital, but is usually caused by brain injury such as from stroke, trauma, tumors, infection, or following surgery.

Vascular and neoplastic (malignant or benign tumours) lesions from the optic tract, to visual cortex can cause a contralateral homonymous hemianopsia. Injury to the right side of the brain will affect the left visual fields of each eye. The more posterior the cerebral lesion, the more symmetric (congruous) the homonymous hemianopsia will be. For example, a person who has a lesion of the right optic tract will no longer see objects on his left side. Similarly, a person who has a stroke to the right occipital lobe will have the same visual field defect, usually more congruent between the two eyes, and there may be macular sparing. A stroke on the right side of the brain (especially parietal lobe), in addition to producing a homonymous hemianopsia, may also lead to the syndrome of hemispatial neglect.

Transient homonymous hemianopsia does not necessarily mean stroke. For instance, it can constitute the aura phase of migraine. Concomitant presence of a moving scintillating scotoma is suggestive of migraine, but has been seen in cerebral cancer as well. Computed tomography (CT scan) or MRI can be used to investigate if stroke, tumor, structural lesion, or demyelination is the cause of homonymous hemianopsia.

== Diagnosis ==
Homonymous hemianopsia secondary to posterior cerebral artery occlusion – may result in syndromes of memory impairment, opposite visual field loss (homonymous hemianopsia), and sometimes hemisensory deficits.

The PCA supplies the occipital lobe and the medial portion of the temporal lobe.

Infarction of occipital cortex typically causes macular sparing hemianopias due to dual blood supply from both posterior cerebral artery and middle cerebral artery.

Occlusion of the calcarine artery that results in infarction of the superior part of the occipital lobe causes a lower peripheral visual field defect.

Posterior cerebral artery penetrating branch occlusion may result in infarction of the posterior capsule, causing hemisensory loss, and (if low enough) a transient hemianopia may also occur.

== Management ==
Prisms or "field expanders" that bend light have been prescribed for decades in patients with hemianopsia. Higher power Fresnel ("stick-on") prisms are commonly employed because they are thin and lightweight, and can be cut and placed in different positions on a spectacle lens.

Peripheral prism spectacles expand the visual field of patients with hemifield visual defects and have the potential to improve visual function and mobility. Prism spectacles incorporate higher power prisms, with variable shapes and designs. The Gottlieb button prism, and the Peli superior and inferior horizontal bands are some proprietary examples of prism glasses. These high power prisms "create" artificial peripheral vision into the non-blind field for obstacle avoidance and motion detection.

Certain counterbalancing brain lesions have also been shown to improve visual deficits in a phenomenon known as the Sprague effect.

== Etymology ==
Homonymous hemianopsia can be broken down as follows:

- Homonymous: (Greek >ομόνυμος = όμοιος + όνομα (same + name) (having the same name or designation) or standing in the same relation
- hemi: ημι-, half
- anopsia: α(ν)+όψις = without + sight; blindness

Homonymous hemianopsia is also called homonymous hemianopia.

== See also ==
- Binasal hemianopsia
- Bitemporal hemianopsia
- Blindsight
- Vision restoration therapy
