= Optic disc pallor =

Finding in eye examinations

Optic disc pallor refers to an abnormal coloration of the optic disc as visualized by a fundoscopic examination. The disc normally has a pink hue and a central yellow depression. With optic disc pallor, an abnormal pale yellow color is evident.
