= Parvocellular =

Parvocellular can refer to:

- Parvocellular cell, located in the lateral geniculate nucleus
- Parvocellular pathway of the visual system
- Parvocellular neurosecretory cell
- Parvocellular red nucleus
- Parvocellular reticular nucleus
