= Parasol cell =

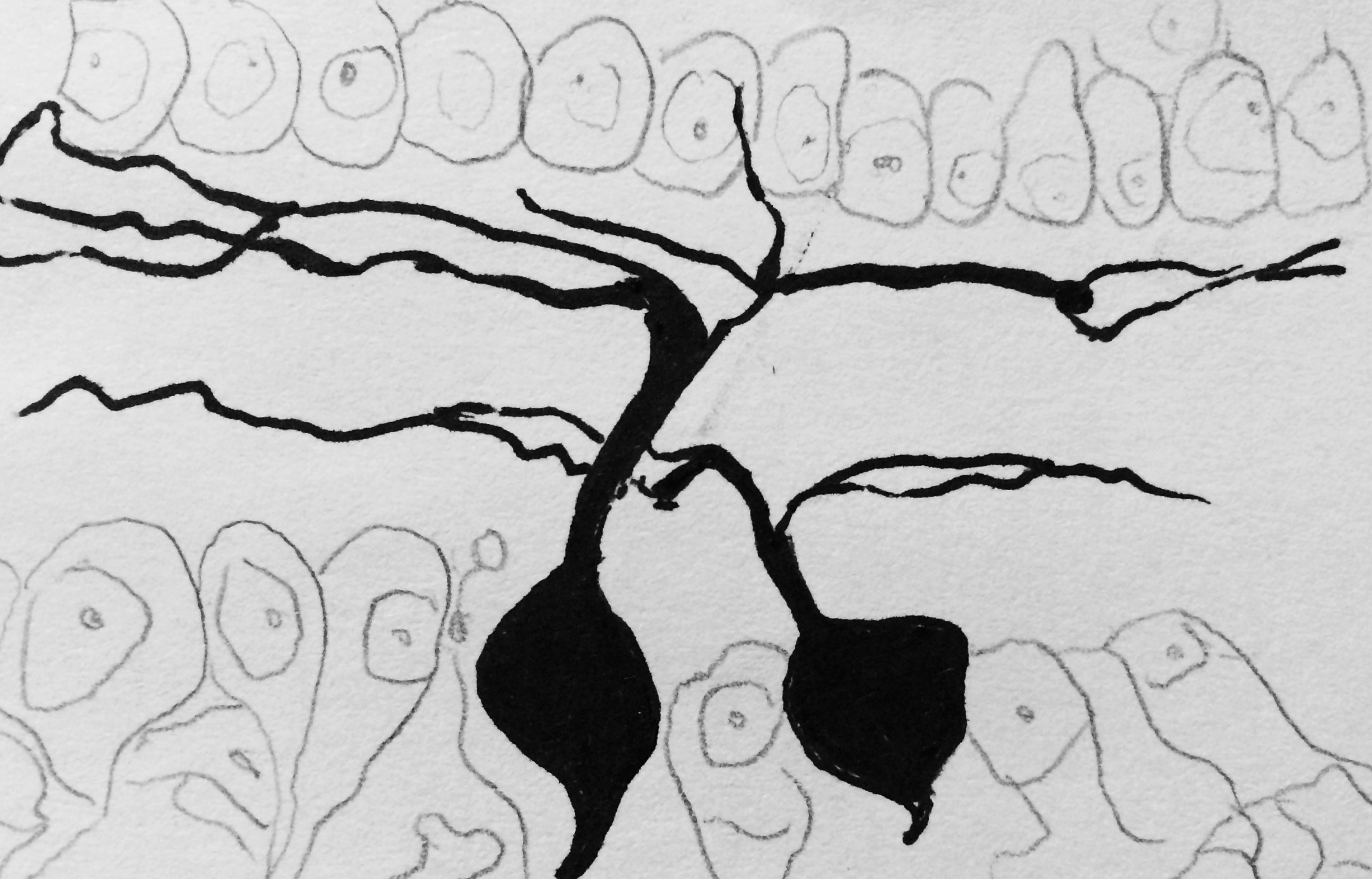
- Parasol cell general structure

Details
- Part of: Retina of eye
- System: Visual system

Identifiers
- FMA: 67916

A parasol cell, sometimes called an M cell or M ganglion cell, is one type of retinal ganglion cell (RGC) located in the ganglion cell layer of the retina. These cells project to magnocellular cells in the lateral geniculate nucleus (LGN) as part of the magnocellular pathway in the visual system. They have large cell bodies as well as extensive branching dendrite networks and as such have large receptive fields. Relative to other RGCs, they have fast conduction velocities. While they do show clear center-surround antagonism (known as spatial opponency), they receive no information about color (absence of chromatic opponency). Parasol ganglion cells contribute information about the motion and depth of objects to the visual system.

== Parasol ganglion cells in the Magnocellular pathway ==
Visual representation of the parvocellular and magnocellular pathways

Parasol ganglion cells are the first step in the magnocellular pathway of the visual system. They project from the retina via the optic nerve to the two most ventral layers of the LGN, which is a nucleus of the thalamus, occupied by the magnocellular cells which then mainly project to the striate cortex (V1), typically to the layer 4Cα.

Eventually, the information these cells collect in the retina is sent to various parts of the visual cortex, including the posterior parietal cortex and area V5 through the dorsal stream, and the inferior temporal cortex and area V4 through the ventral stream.

== Structure ==
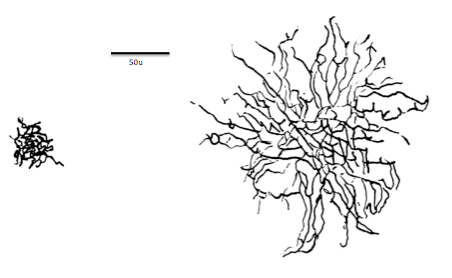
A sketch of a parasol cell (right) alongside a midget cell (left) for size comparison

Parasol ganglion cells are located in the retina of the eyes, and make up roughly 10% of all retinal ganglion cells. They have large bodies with extensive, overlapping branched dendrites, and thick, heavily myelinated axons. These properties allow parasol cells to conduct signals very quickly, much faster than the midget cells that feed the P pathway.

Parasol ganglion cells collect information from large receptive fields, containing both rods and cones. Despite the input from cones, parasol ganglion cells do not receive information about color. Unlike midget cells, parasol cell receptive fields contain the same color-type of cones in both their center and surround regions. Due to this lack of specificity, parasol cells cannot differentiate between different light wavelengths reflected from a specific object, and thus can only send achromatic information.

There is approximately the same density of parasol ganglion cells in the fovea as in the rest of the retina, another property that distinguishes them from midget cells.

=== Parasol vs. Midget cells ===
Parasol and midget retinal cells begin the parallel magnocellular and parvocellular pathways, respectively. While both parasol cells and midget cells play an important role in the visual system, their anatomies and functional contributions differ.

RGC Type	Parasol Cell	Midget Cell
Pathway it's involved in	Magnocellular Pathway	Parvocellular Pathway
Cell body size	Large	Small
Dendritic tree	Complex	Less complex
Conduction rate	~1.6 ms	~2 ms
Function in visual system	"Where" objects are; "How" to grasp the objects	"What" objects are according to fine detail
Sensitivity to spatial frequency	Low	Medium to high
Temporal frequency	High	Low
Color opponency	Achromatic	Red-green opponency

== Function ==
Parasol retinal ganglion cells cannot provide finely detailed or colored information, but still provide useful static, depth, and motion information. Parasol ganglion cells have high light/dark contrast detection, and are more sensitive at low spatial frequencies than high spatial frequencies. Due to this contrast information, these cells are good at detecting changes in luminance, and thus provide useful information for performing visual search tasks and detecting edges.

Parasol retinal ganglion cells are also important for providing information about the location of objects. These cells can detect the orientation and position of objects in space, information that will eventually be sent through the dorsal stream. This information is also useful for detecting the difference in positions of objects on the retina of each eye, an important tool in binocular depth perception.

Parasol cells have the ability to detect high temporal frequencies, and can thus detect quick changes in the position of an object. This is the basis for detecting motion. The information sent to the intraparietal sulcus (IPS) of the posterior parietal cortex allows the magnocellular pathway to direct attention and guide saccadic eye movements to follow important moving objects in the visual field. In addition to following objects with the eyes, the IPS sends information to parts of the frontal lobe that allows the hands and arms to adjust their movements to correctly grasp objects based on their size, position, and location. This ability has led some neuroscientists to hypothesize that the purpose of the magnocellular pathway is not to detect spatial locations, but to guide actions related to the position and motion of objects.

== Research and experimentation ==
While neurons are typically studied by the extracellular use of metal electrodes, retinal ganglion cells are specifically studied in vitro. This method allows parasol cells' complicated and intertwined structure to be analyzed intracellularly. In 1941, Polyak was the first scientist to use Golgi staining to identify retinal ganglion cells. Here, dendritic morphology was closely analyzed and revealed large dendritic trees. Later in 1986, Kaplan and Shapley were then the first researchers to link parasol cells with the visual system. Recordings of S potentials at the axon terminals of RGCs in the LGN suggest that there is high contrast sensitivity in the cells terminating in the magnocellular layer of primates; opposed by low contrast sensitivity in cells found in the parvocellular layer.

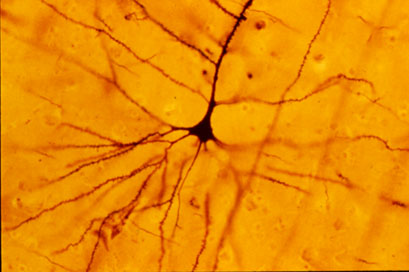
Golgi stain of a neuron.

=== Primates and other model systems ===
Both old and new world primates have been used as model systems for human vision and have subsequently been beneficial in researching parasol cells. Many retrograde labeling experiments using macaques, for example, have linked parasol and midget retinal ganglion cells with the magnocellular and parvocellular pathways respectively. In addition, similar studies have led to theories underlying color opponency. Research by Dacey (1996) supports this idea where in vitro primate retinal cells were treated with dye fillings. Parasol cells of the magnocellular pathway were found to be achromatic. In other studies, new world monkeys, such as marmosets, have aided in the current understanding of spatial and temporal frequency of the magnocellular layer in the LGN. Using the Nissl staining method, the magnocellular layer, in addition to the parvocellular layer, have darker and more dense cell bodies than the koniocellular layers, for example.

Retinal ganglion cells of cats have been studied and compared to those in the visual system of both primates and humans. Evidence on receptive fields of cats confirms that parasol cell receptive fields are larger than those of midget cells because of their cellular structure. The same is likely to be found in human retinal cells which allows for better spatial localization.

== Associated disorders ==
Abnormal signalling in the magnocellular pathway has been associated with dyslexia and schizophrenia.

=== Dyslexia ===
There is a theory that problems with underdeveloped parasol ganglion cells may contribute to causing dyslexia. Motion information contributed by parasol ganglion cells to the vision system helps the brain adjust the eyes in coordinated saccades, and problems in saccadic motion may lead to blurry vision and reading problems. This underdevelopment may be caused by several factors, including nutritional deficiencies and mutations in the KIAA0319 gene on chromosome six. Additionally, autoimmune attacks by antineuronal antibodies may prevent adequate parasol ganglion cell development for normal functioning, a theory which would explain why weakened immune systems are frequently present in dyslexic individuals.

== See also ==
- Bistratified cell
- Midget cell
- Photosensitive ganglion cell
