= Polyak =

Polyak is a Hungarian ethnonymic surname literally meaning "Polish person". that may refer to

- Imre Polyák (1932–2010), Hungarian wrestler
- Kornelia Polyak, professor of medicine at Harvard Medical School and breast cancer scientist
- Kristóf Polyák (born 1995), Hungarian football player
- Stephen Polyak (1889–1995), American neuroanatomist and neurologist

== See also ==
- Polak
