= Ganglion cell =

Class of peripheral neurons

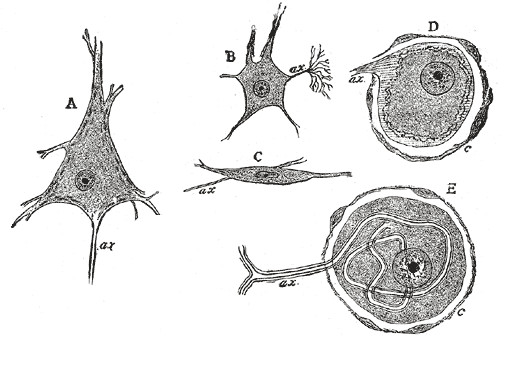
- Various forms of nerve cells.: A. Pyramidal cell.; B. Small multipolar cell, in which the dendrites quickly divides into numerous branches.; C. Small fusiform cell.; D and E. Ganglion cells

Details
- Location: Varies by type
- Shape: Varies
- Function: Varies but often excitatory projection
- Neurotransmitter: Varies but often glutamate

== Introduction ==
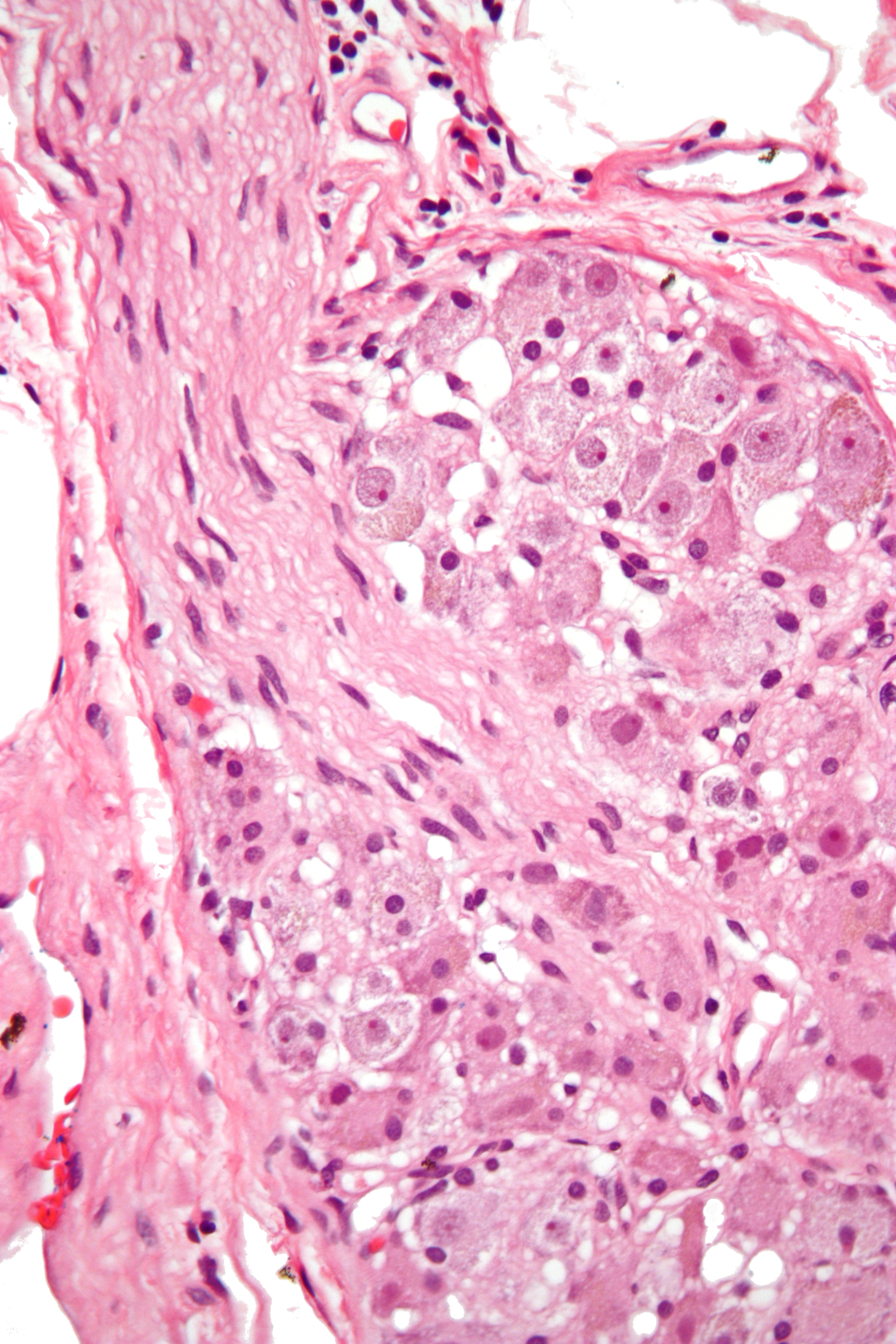
Ganglion cells within a ganglion. H&E stain.

In neurophysiology, a ganglion cell is a cell found in a ganglion (a cluster of neurons in the peripheral nervous system). Depending on their location and function, ganglion cells can be categorized into several major groups:

- Retinal ganglion cell (RGC) found in the ganglion cell layer of the retina
- Cells that reside in the adrenal medulla, where they are involved in the sympathetic nervous system's release of epinephrine and norepinephrine into the blood stream
- Cells of the sympathetic ganglia
- Cells of the parasympathetic ganglia
- Cells of the spiral ganglia

== General Morphology ==
During the late 1800s, early 1900s, Spanish Neuroscientist and Pathologist Santiago Ramón y Cajal proposed Neuron theory which basically introduced the idea that the Nervous system contained cells called the Neuron. The process he used was called Golgi staining of the vertebrate retina. Cajal was able to differentiate between different types of Ganglion cell based on dendritic morphology, cell body and dendritic tree size, and number of sub layers in which they arborize/stratification layers. Through this study, he discovered that the ganglion cell distribution amongst vertebrates were pretty similar minus the Rods and cones in the retinas.

In the 1940s, American Neurologist Stephen Polyak produced description of the Golgi-impregnated Cells that helped further classify types of Ganglion Cells. This data helped scientists get a better understanding of the ganglion cells present in the retinas of Mammals and Primates

In 1974, Boycott and Wassle created a scheme for the classification of Ganglion Cells that was found to be in the cat retina. These cells, alpha, beta, delta and gamma are seen to be linked with the X, Y and W types of physiology. Boycott and Wassle confirmed the idea of Cajal's Ox and Dog retina idea by naming the alpha and beta.

In 1978, the idea of the alpha and beta ganglion cells could be divided into different subgroups, sublamina a and sublamina b. Sublamina a contains dendrite cells containing OFF-center receptive fields while the Sublamina b contains On-center receptive fields.

== Types of Retinal Ganglion Cells ==
The most studied classes are the parvocellular (P), magnocellular (M), and koniocellular (K) cells, with a fourth class, the intrinsically photosensitive retinal ganglion cells (ipRGCs).

Parvocellular (P) Cells : P-cells make up approximately 70% of all ganglion cells. They are highly concentrated in the fovea. They exhibit center-surround receptive fields and are primarily involved in processing fine spatial detail and color. These cells have high spatial acuity vision and have strong color opponency. However, their temporal resolution is very poor and have low contrast sensitivity.

Magnocellular (M) cells : M-cells contain 10% of the RGCs, and show center-surround receptive fields and is more responsive to changes in luminance and motion. They are crucial for detecting motion and depth because they possess contrast sensitivity and high temporal resolution. In comparison to P cells, Magnocellular (M) cells do not display color opponency, and have much lower spatial resolution.

Koniocellular (K) Cells : K-cells only account for 10% of total ganglion cell population. These cells have irregular receptive field and do not show center-surround feature. They haven't been fully understood yet but are known to be involved in processing blue-yellow color contrast and overall illumination changes. They project in a patchy and disorganized way to the Lateral Geniculate Nucleus (LGN). These cells are believed to have a role in motion detection but their exact function is still unknown.

Intrinsically Photosensitive Retinal Ganglion cells (ipRGCs) : These cells are the fourth type and constitute a different subset of RGCs that contain melanopsin, a photopigment that allows them to respond to light directly without any input from cones or rods. ipRGCs represent non-image forming function functions like sleep-wake cycles, pupillary light reflex, and circadian rhythm regulation. It sends signals to the SCN (suprachiasmatic nucleus) of the hypothalamus through the retinohypothalamic tract. Their photo-transduction mechanism differs from the cone and rod pathways and involves a melanopsin based G-protein cascade and TRP channels.

== Disorders Relating to Ganglion Cells ==
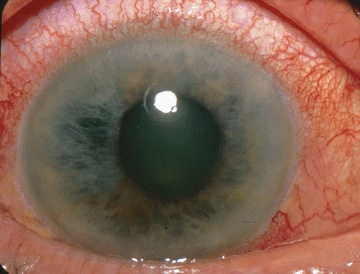

Glaucoma: Glaucoma is a collection of diseases that damages the nerve in the eye / retina. The damage in the nerve has the possibility to cause blindness. You may not know you have a Glaucoma without an in-depth eye exam normally using the dilation method. There is no cure for a Glaucoma, but it may be treated if found early. It is unknown the cause of a Glaucoma, but those who may be at risk include:

- Individuals over the age of 60 (most commonly those who are Latino American)
- African Americans over the age of 40 years old Individuals with a family history of Glaucoma's.

Hereditary optic neuroretinopathy: There are two different types of Hereditary Optic Neuroretinopathy, those including Leber's hereditary optic neuropathy and Autosomal Dominant Optic Atrophy. The Leber's Neuropathy is caused by a mutation in the Mitochondrial DNA (the DNA located inside the chromosome) This is only obtainable through the mother. Some individuals are carriers and experience no symptoms. Symptoms of individuals who are affected by Leber's Neuropathy include:

- Beginning with: loss of vision or clouding in the one eye, normally takes a few weeks before traveling to the other eye. most times not painful

Autosomal Dominant Optic Atrophy is a mutated gene in the autosomes (not sex-linked genes in humans chromosome pairs 1-22). This trait is present in anyone with the mutation in the autosome. The individual only needs one mutated gene to be affected. Symptoms of this condition include:

- Vision loss - in both eyes at the same time. The time it takes to occur varies per person, but normally progresses slowly.

These diseases can be examined by tests such as Eye exams, Image testing and a look through family history.

Parkinson's disease: Parkinson's Disease is a condition that originates in the Nervous System and affects parts controlled by the nervous system. This disease is progressive, meaning it progressively gets worse over time. A slow loss of Retinal Ganglion Cells may be observed over time. List of symptoms include:

- Loss or lack of control in motor functions (i.e. Tremors)
- Change in cognitive function(i.e. Behavior, thoughts, and mood)
- Psychosis (losing contact with reality)
- and more.

Those who are at risk include genes (through family members), toxins from the environment, and the presence of Lewy bodies.
