= Blob (visual system) =

Blobs are sections of primary visual cortex (V1) above and below layer IV where groups of neurons sensitive to color assemble in cylindrical shapes. They were first identified in 1979 by Margaret Wong-Riley in cats when she used a cytochrome oxidase stain, from which they get their name. These areas receive input from koniocellular cells in the dorsal lateral geniculate nucleus dLGN and output to the thin stripes of area V2. Interblobs are areas between blobs that receive the same input, but are sensitive to orientation instead of color. They output to the pale and thick stripes of area V2.

Blobs are on the koniocellular pathway. This pathway begins at the photoreceptors which then relay signals to the 'K' ganglion cells in the retina. The pathway then continues out of the eye to the layers in-between the parvocellular and magnocellular layers of the dLGN. This pathway then terminates at the blobs in V1. Lesioning of the koniocellular pathway leads to lack of acuity in shapes and colour.
