= M cells =

M cells may refer to:

- Microfold cell
- Magnocellular cell
- Motilin secreting cells of the gastrointestinal tract
