= Midget cell =

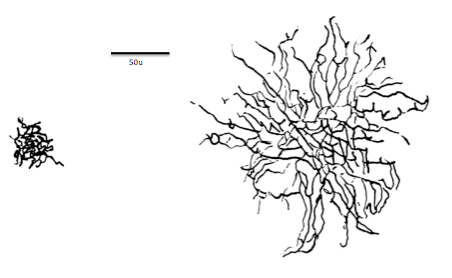
- A sketch of a parasol cell (right) alongside a midget cell (left) for size comparison

Details
- Part of: Retina of eye
- System: Visual system

Identifiers
- FMA: 62360

A midget cell, sometimes called a P cell or P ganglion cell, is one type of retinal ganglion cell (RGC). Midget cells originate in the ganglion cell layer of the retina, and project to the parvocellular layers of the lateral geniculate nucleus (LGN). The axons of midget cells travel through the optic nerve and optic tract, ultimately synapsing with parvocellular cells in the LGN. These cells are known as midget retinal ganglion cells due to the small sizes of their dendritic trees and cell bodies. About 80% of RGCs are midget cells. They receive inputs from relatively few rods and cones. In many cases, they are connected to midget bipolar cells, which are linked to one cone each.

These neurons show roughly circular receptive fields with antagonistic center and surround; this property is known as spatial opponency and these neurons are typically divided into ON- or OFF-center, depending on whether they are excited or inhibited by photons falling on the center of their receptive fields. Most of these cells are chromatically opponent, meaning that long- and medium-wavelength visible light (commonly approximated to red and green, respectively) exert opposing effects on the center and the surround. For instance, a chromatically opponent L-ON (Long ON) midget cell would be excited (and more likely to spike action potentials) if light of long wavelength falls on the cone or cones in the center of its receptive field but would be inhibited by medium-wavelength light falling on the surround of its receptive field. However, not all midget cells are chromatically opponent.

They have slow conduction velocity and are very responsive to high temporal frequencies (i.e. rapidly and low spatial frequencies).

== See also ==
- Bistratified cell
- Parasol cell
- Photosensitive ganglion cell
