= Stephen Polyak =

- Born: Stjepan Lucian Poljak; December 13, 1889; Đurđevac, Austria-Hungary (present-day Croatia)
- Died: March 9, 1955 (aged 65); Chicago, Illinois, U.S.
- Education: University of Zagreb; University of Graz; Odessa University
- Known for: work on retina and visual system
- Scientific career
- Fields: Anatomy, neurology
- Workplaces: University Hospital Centre Zagreb; University of California, Berkeley; University of Chicago
- Academic advisors: Santiago Ramón y Cajal; Karl Lashley; Grafton Elliot Smith

Stephen Polyak (born Stjepan Lucian Poljak; December 13, 1889 – March 9, 1955) was an American neuroanatomist and neurologist considered to be one of the most prominent neuroanatomists of the 20th century.

Polyak studied the functional structure of the organs of sight and hearing, explaining the function of the retina and the cochlea, and visual and auditory pathways and centers. He also gave a new interpretation of the basic visual processes.

== Selected works ==
- The Retina. University of Chicago Press. 1941. ISBN 9780598445704. OCLC 999459196.
- Klüver, Heinrich, ed. (1957). The Vertebrate Visual System. The University of Chicago Press. OCLC 500463687.

== See also ==
- Midget cell
- Parasol cell
