= Giant retinal ganglion cells =

Type of cell within the eye

Giant retinal ganglion cells are photosensitive ganglion cells with large dendritic trees discovered in the human and macaque retina by Dacey et al. (2005).

Giant retinal ganglion cells contain a photo-pigment, melanopsin, allowing them to respond directly to light. They also receive connections from rods and cones, allowing them to encode colour and spatial information. Dacey et al. found the giants' receptive field sizes to be about three times the diameter of those of parasol ganglion cells.

When a giant is responding directly to light, Dacey et al. found its spectral sensitivity function to be similar in shape to those of rods and cones, but with a peak at 482 nm, in between S cones and rods. Dacey et al. also found giants' dynamic range to be 3-4 log units, far larger than any other photoreceptor type's and covering nearly the entire range of illuminations of natural daylight. Under naturalistic lighting conditions, responses to the rods and cones are superimposed on the melanopsin response of giant retinal ganglion cells. Giants encode colour via an S-Off, (L + M)-On opponency. Their spatial modulation transfer function is low-pass, with an upper limit of about 0.6 cycles per degree.

Dacey et al. propose that the giants subserve the subconscious, 'non-image-forming' functions of circadian photoentrainment and pupillary diameter, and via the rod and cone inputs, may help mediate conscious perception of irradiance.
