= Retinal ganglion cell =

Type of cell within the eye

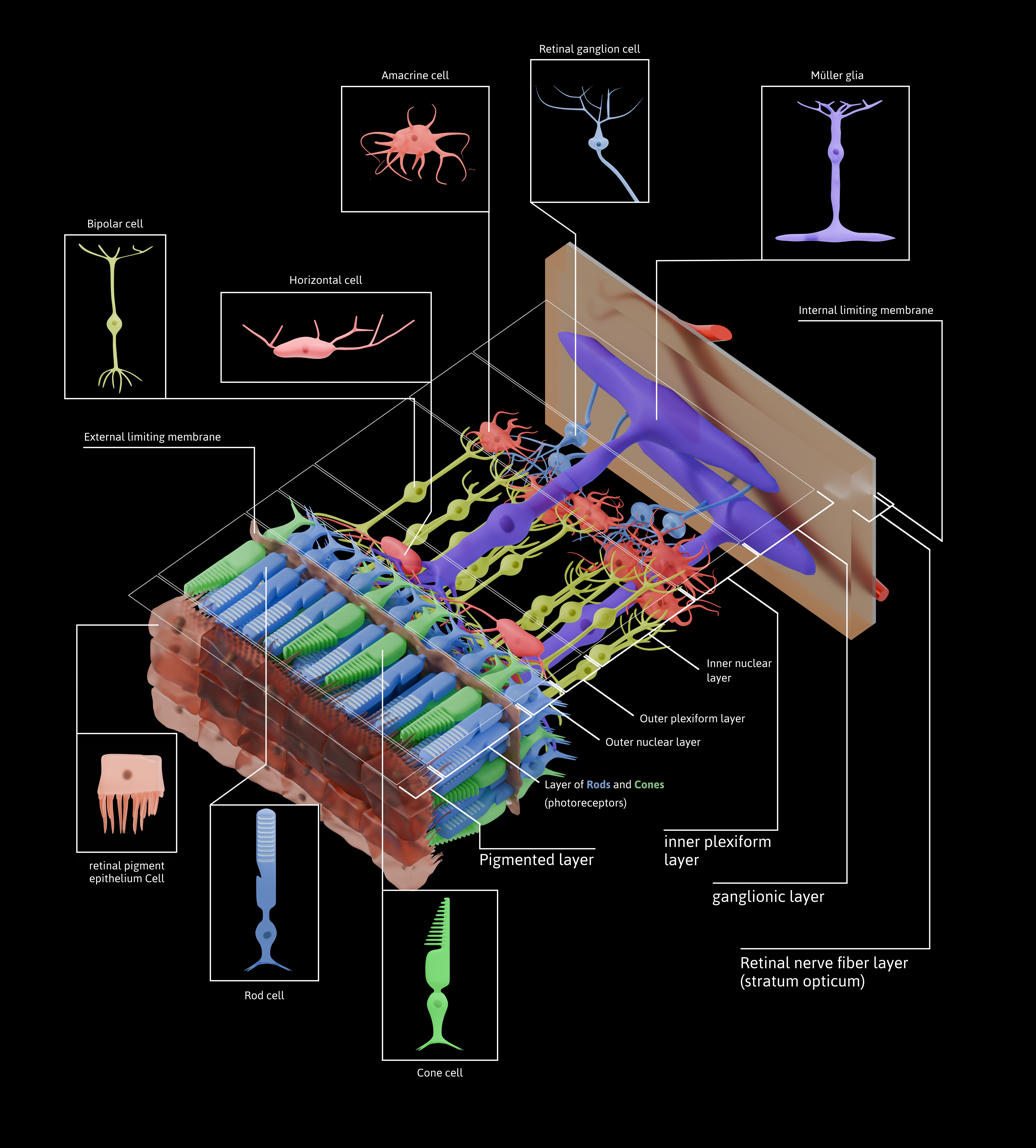
- Diagram showing cross-section of retinal layers. The area labeled "Ganglionic layer" (bottom right) contains retinal ganglion cells, and a ganglion cell label is visible at the top center.

Identifiers
- MeSH: D012165
- NeuroLex ID: nifext_17
- FMA: 67765

A class of neurons that transmit visual input received from the rods and cones in the retina of the eye to the brain

A retinal ganglion cell (RGC) is a type of neuron located near the inner surface (the ganglion cell layer) of the retina of the eye. It receives visual information from photoreceptors via two intermediate neuron types: bipolar cells and retina amacrine cells. Retina amacrine cells, particularly narrow field cells, are important for creating functional subunits within the ganglion cell layer and making it so that ganglion cells can observe a small dot moving a small distance. Retinal ganglion cells collectively transmit image-forming and non-image forming visual information from the retina in the form of action potential to several regions in the thalamus, hypothalamus, and mesencephalon, or midbrain.

Retinal ganglion cells vary significantly in terms of their size, connections, and responses to visual stimulation but they all share the defining property of having a long axon that extends into the brain. These axons form the optic nerve, optic chiasm, and optic tract.

A small percentage of retinal ganglion cells contribute little or nothing to vision, but are themselves photosensitive; their axons form the retinohypothalamic tract and contribute to circadian rhythms and pupillary light reflex, the resizing of the pupil.

== Function ==
There are about 0.7 to 1.5 million retinal ganglion cells in the human retina. With about 4.6 million cone cells and 92 million rod cells, or 96.6 million photoreceptors per retina, on average each retinal ganglion cell receives inputs from about 100 rods and cones. However, these numbers vary greatly among individuals and as a function of retinal location. In the fovea (center of the retina), a single ganglion cell will communicate with as few as five photoreceptors. In the extreme periphery (edge of the retina), a single ganglion cell will receive information from many thousands of photoreceptors.. Ganglion cells receive input from a vertical pathway (traveling via bipolar cells only) or a horizontal pathway (which includes horizontal and amacrine cells as well).

Center and surround tend to behave oppositely and in fact the surround may inhibit the center. The signals from bipolar and amacrine cells start chemically then proceed electrically. Ganglion cells are fine tuned to such factors as size, color, and movement. The brain must make sense out of this data, including changes thereof. Subtle movements can cause detection of the motion by the ganglion cell field. They typically have a preferred direction in which stimuli move, and the opposite direction is considered "null." Neurotransmitters such as acetylcholine and GABA work to produce directional selectivity.

Retinal ganglion cells spontaneously fire action potentials at a base rate while at rest. Excitation of retinal ganglion cells results in an increased firing rate while inhibition results in a depressed rate of firing.

If the cell is activated by light, it is called an ON signal, and its dendrites are near ganglion cells and receive their signals from ON-center bipolar cells. When light is absent, there is an OFF signal, which derives its input via dendrites near amacrine cells and receiving signals from OFF-center bipolar cells. The ON-OFF are activated when light is switched either on or off (but quiet otherwise). These typically have bistratified dendrites.

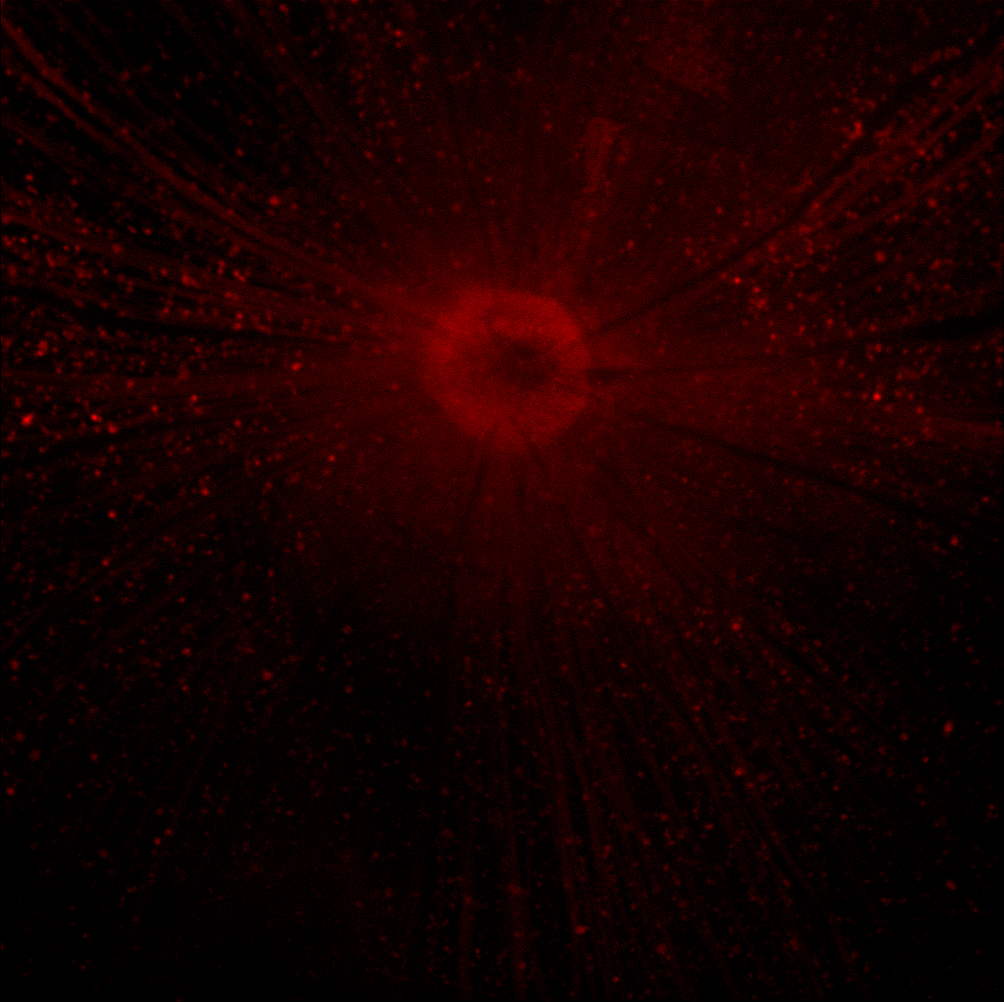
A false-color image of a flat-mounted rat retina viewed through a fluorescence microscope at 50× magnification. The optic nerve was injected with a fluorophore, causing retinal ganglion cells to fluoresce.

== Types ==
There is wide variability in ganglion cell types across species. In primates, including humans, there are generally three classes of RGCs:

- W-ganglion: small, 40% of total, broad fields in retina, excitation from rods. Detection of direction movement anywhere in the field.
- X-ganglion: medium diameter, 55% of total, small field, color vision. Sustained response.
- Y-ganglion: largest, 5%, very broad dendritic field, respond to rapid eye movement or rapid change in light intensity. Transient response.

The W, X and Y retinal ganglion types arose from studies of the cat. These physiological types are closely related to the respective morphological retinal ganglion types $\gamma$, $\beta$ and $\alpha$.

Based on their projections and functions, there are at least five main classes of retinal ganglion cells:

- Midget cell (parvocellular/P pathway; P cells)
- Parasol cell (magnocellular/M pathway; M cells)
- Bistratified cell (koniocellular/K pathway; K cells)
- Photosensitive ganglion cells
- Other ganglion cells projecting to the superior colliculus for eye movements (saccades)

=== P-type ===
P-type retinal ganglion cells project to the parvocellular layers of the lateral geniculate nucleus. These cells are known as midget retinal ganglion cells, based on the small sizes of their dendritic trees and cell bodies. They are also called tonic cells, and have slow and steady transmission of signals, and better reception of contrast and detail. About 80% of all retinal ganglion cells are midget cells in the parvocellular pathway. The cells of the central retina are typically this type, but further away there is greater input from dendrites. They receive inputs from relatively few rods and cones. They have slow conduction velocity, and respond to changes in color but respond only weakly to changes in contrast unless the change is great. They have simple center-surround receptive fields, where the center may be either ON or OFF while the surround is the opposite. Moreover, they may be chromatic opponent units. Their dendritic trees are the size of their cell body.

Simulated array of parvocellular +M-L (green on) responses (right) to a natural video (left). Notice the relatively high spatial acuity, and sustained temporal responses in this pathway.

=== M-type ===
M-type retinal ganglion cells project to the magnocellular layers of the lateral geniculate nucleus. These cells are known as parasol retinal ganglion cells, based on the large sizes of their dendritic trees and cell bodies. About 10% of all retinal ganglion cells are parasol cells, and these cells are part of the magnocellular pathway. They receive inputs from relatively many rods and cones. They have fast conduction velocity, and can respond to low-contrast stimuli, but are not very sensitive to changes in color. They have much larger receptive fields which are nonetheless also center-surround. These are also known as phasic cells, and have faster speeds of transmission speed than the tonic cells. They are present throughout the retina, and have a larger dendritic field than tonic cells.

Simulated array of magnocellular OFF responses (right) to a natural video (left). Notice more transient temporal responses in this pathway, compared to the P-type. This retinal pathway is largely color blind.

=== K-type ===
BiK-type retinal ganglion cells project to the koniocellular layers of the lateral geniculate nucleus. K-type retinal ganglion cells have been identified only relatively recently. Koniocellular means "cells as small as dust"; their small size made them hard to find. About 10% of all retinal ganglion cells are bistratified cells, and these cells go through the koniocellular pathway. They receive inputs from intermediate numbers of rods and cones. They may be involved in color vision. They have very large receptive fields that only have centers (no surrounds) and are always ON to the blue cone and OFF to both the red and green cone.

Simulated array of koniocellular +S (blue on) responses (right) to a natural video (left). Notice the low spatial acuity, reflecting the very large receptive fields.

=== Photosensitive ganglion cell ===
Photosensitive ganglion cells, including but not limited to the giant retinal ganglion cells, contain their own photopigment, melanopsin, which makes them respond directly to light even in the absence of rods and cones. They project to, among other areas, the suprachiasmatic nucleus (SCN) via the retinohypothalamic tract for setting and maintaining circadian rhythms. Other retinal ganglion cells projecting to the lateral geniculate nucleus (LGN) include cells making connections with the Edinger–Westphal nucleus (EW), for control of the pupillary light reflex, and giant retinal ganglion cells.

== Physiology ==
Most mature ganglion cells are able to fire action potentials at a high frequency because of their expression of K_{v}3 potassium channels.

Ganglion cells transmit a large number of signals to the brain from different locations, and objects can be found in many adjacent pathways en route to the brain. They are placed in mosaics which keeps them separate. High-frequency patterns may behave like low-frequency patterns, known as aliasing. The ganglion cell can integrate and hence attenuate these signals. Mosaics can sometimes cause interference. There is also potential for hyperacuity in the ganglion cell.

Ganglion cells share input from neighboring territory. Concurrent signals are strengthened in the brain. If both are alike (ON or OFF), they join together, if opposite, the second is shut off. These ganglion cell fields must overlap, wholly or partially. If stimuli are separate, the signal remains separate, but if it overlaps then the signal will merge, possibly with the use of gap junctions.

Ganglion cells receive neurotransmitters across the synapse from amacrine and bipolar cells, which is converted into an electrical impulse by means of ion channels across the synapse. Excitatory neurotransmitters such as glutamate and acetylcholine depolarize the membrane by allowing positive ions to flow through the channels, whereas inhibitory ones like glycine and GABA do so with negative ions. Ganglion cells, nevertheless, go beyond merely selecting from different ion channels. They focus on specific synapses to limit neural sources, namely, amacrine and bipolar cells. Upon stimulation by light, ON-center ganglion cells will be turned on, but OFF-center cells will be shut off. The amacrine cell is the deciding factor in the control of the latter response.

=== Color, Scotopic, and Mesopic Vision ===
Ganglion cells respond to color using either luminance (addition) or opponent (subtraction) mechanisms.Tonic cells react to color stimuli in center-surround opponent fields, using an ON or OFF center mechanism, hence creating six possible spectral fields. Multiple cone mechanisms may possibly lead to 12 forms. Phasic cells can achieve central sustained responses, but when surrounds are involved, these are cancelled. Summation of center and surround can give a solely central response. The main task of a phasic cell is luminance, not color. Another type of color receptor is a center only neuron, which is bistratified and has no surround action. They are either red-green or blue-yellow, and are stimulated first by one color and then by the other.

Rod (scotopic) vision is only truly experienced in a rural milieu with no moon or streetlights. A moderate environment between a photopic and scotopic one is known as mesopic. Phasic cells, the primary route of transmission, are mixed in their population of rod input; tonic cell input is disputed. Activities done at night, such as driving or sports, are impacted by the slower reaction time of rod vision. The ganglion cells have no threshold of photons entering, and in utter darkness have background noise against which light input reacts. Even just one photon is enough to expand to other ganglion cells, but the background noise interferes, requiring multiple photons. When dark-adapted, the central visual field of ganglion cells is large at the expense of the surround. It also, as expected, reacts more slowly.

== Pathology ==
Degeneration of axons of the retinal ganglion cells (the optic nerve) is a hallmark of glaucoma.

== Developmental biology ==
=== Retinal growth: the beginning ===
Retinal ganglion cells (RGCs) are born between embryonic day 11 and post-natal day zero in the mouse and between week 5 and week 18 in utero in human development. In mammals, RGCs are typically added at the beginning in the dorsal central aspect of the optic cup, or eye primordium. Then RC growth sweeps out ventrally and peripherally from there in a wave-like pattern. This process depends on a host of factors, ranging from signaling factors like FGF3 and FGF8 to proper inhibition of the Notch signaling pathway. Most importantly, the bHLH (basic helix-loop-helix)-domain containing transcription factor Atoh7 and its downstream effectors, such as Brn3b and Isl-1, work to promote RGC survival and differentiation. The "differentiation wave" that drives RGC development across the retina is also regulated in particular of the bHLH factors Neurog2 and Ascl1 and FGF/Shh signaling, deriving from the periphery.

=== Growth within the retinal ganglion cell (optic fiber) layer ===
Early progenitor RGCs will typically extend processes connecting to the inner and outer limiting membranes of the retina with the outer layer adjacent to the retinal pigment epithelium and inner adjacent to the future vitreous humor. The cell soma will pull towards the pigment epithelium, undergo a terminal cell division and differentiation, and then migrate backwards towards the inner limiting membrane in a process called somal translocation. The kinetics of RGC somal translocation and underlying mechanisms are best understood in the zebrafish. The RGC will then extend an axon in the retinal ganglion cell layer, which is directed by laminin contact. The retraction of the apical process of the RGC is likely mediated by Slit–Robo signaling.

RGCs will grow along glial end feet positioned on the inner surface (side closest to the future vitreous humor). Neural cell adhesion molecule (N-CAM) will mediate this attachment via homophilic interactions between molecules of like isoforms (A or B). Slit signaling also plays a role, preventing RGCs from growing into layers beyond the optic fiber layer.

Axons from the RGCs will grow and extend towards the optic disc, where they exit the eye. Once differentiated, they are bordered by an inhibitory peripheral region and a central attractive region, thus promoting extension of the axon towards the optic disc. CSPGs exist along the retinal neuroepithelium (surface over which the RGCs lie) in a peripheral high–central low gradient. Slit is also expressed in a similar pattern, secreted from the cells in the lens. Adhesion molecules, like N-CAM and L1, will promote growth centrally and will also help to properly fasciculate (bundle) the RGC axons together. Shh is expressed in a high central, low peripheral gradient, promoting central-projecting RGC axons extension via Patched-1, the principal receptor for Shh, mediated signaling.

=== Growth into and through the optic nerve ===
RGCs exit the retinal ganglion cell layer through the optic disc, which requires a 45° turn. This requires complex interactions with optic disc glial cells which will express local gradients of Netrin-1, a morphogen that will interact with the Deleted in Colorectal Cancer (DCC) receptor on growth cones of the RGC axon. This morphogen initially attracts RGC axons, but then, through an internal change in the growth cone of the RGC, netrin-1 becomes repulsive, pushing the axon away from the optic disc. This is mediated through a cAMP-dependent mechanism. Additionally, CSPGs and Eph–ephrin signaling may also be involved.

RGCs will grow along glial cell end feet in the optic nerve. These glia will secrete repulsive semaphorin 5a and Slit in a surround fashion, covering the optic nerve which ensures that they remain in the optic nerve. Vax1, a transcription factor, is expressed by the ventral diencephalon and glial cells in the region where the chiasm is formed, and it may also be secreted to control chiasm formation.

=== Growth at the optic chiasm ===
When RGCs approach the optic chiasm, the point at which the two optic nerves meet, at the ventral diencephalon around embryonic days 10–11 in the mouse, they have to make the decision to cross to the contralateral optic tract or remain in the ipsilateral optic tract. In the mouse, about 5% of RGCs, mostly those coming from the ventral-temporal crescent (VTc) region of the retina, will remain ipsilateral, while the remaining 95% of RGCs will cross. This is largely controlled by the degree of binocular overlap between the two fields of sight in both eyes. Mice do not have a significant overlap, whereas, humans, who do, will have about 50% of RGCs cross and 50% will remain ipsilateral.

==== Building the repulsive outline of the chiasm ====
Once RGCs reach the chiasm, the glial cells supporting them will change from an intrafascicular to radial morphology. A group of diencephalic cells that express the cell surface antigen stage-specific embryonic antigen (SSEA)-1 and CD44 will form an inverted V-shape. They will establish the posterior aspect of the optic chiasm border. Additionally, Slit signaling is important here: Heparin sulfate proteoglycans, proteins in the ECM, will anchor the Slit morphogen at specific points in the posterior chiasm border. RGCs will begin to express Robo, the receptor for Slit, at this point, thus facilitating the repulsion.

==== Contralateral projecting RGCs ====
RGC axons traveling to the contralateral optic tract need to cross. Shh, expressed along the midline in the ventral diencephalon, provides a repulsive cue to prevent RGCs from crossing the midline ectopically. However, a hole is generated in this gradient, thus allowing RGCs to cross.

Molecules mediating attraction include NrCAM, which is expressed by growing RGCs and the midline glia and acts along with Sema6D, mediated via the plexin-A1 receptor. VEGF-A is released from the midline directs RGCs to take a contralateral path, mediated by the neuropilin-1 (NRP1) receptor. cAMP seems to be very important in regulating the production of NRP1 protein, thus regulating the growth cones response to the VEGF-A gradient in the chiasm.

==== Ipsilateral projecting RGCs ====
The only component in mice projecting ipsilaterally are RGCs from the ventral-temporal crescent in the retina, and only because they express the Zic2 transcription factor. Zic2 will promote the expression of the tyrosine kinase receptor EphB1, which, through forward signaling (see review by Xu et al.) will bind to ligand ephrin B2 expressed by midline glia and be repelled to turn away from the chiasm. Some VTc RGCs will project contralaterally because they express the transcription factor Islet-2, which is a negative regulator of Zic2 production.

Shh plays a key role in keeping RGC axons ipsilateral as well. Shh is expressed by the contralaterally projecting RGCs and midline glial cells. Boc, or Brother of CDO (CAM-related/downregulated by oncogenes), a co-receptor for Shh that influences Shh signaling through Ptch1, seems to mediate this repulsion, as it is only on growth cones coming from the ipsilaterally projecting RGCs.

Other factors influencing ipsilateral RGC growth include the Teneurin family, which are transmembrane adhesion proteins that use homophilic interactions to control guidance, and Nogo, which is expressed by midline radial glia. The Nogo receptor is only expressed by VTc RGCs.

Finally, other transcription factors seem to play a significant role in altering. For example, Foxg1, also called Brain-Factor 1, and Foxd1, also called Brain Factor 2, are winged-helix transcription factors that are expressed in the nasal and temporal optic cups and the optic vesicles begin to evaginate from the neural tube. These factors are also expressed in the ventral diencephalon, with Foxd1 expressed near the chiasm, while Foxg1 is expressed more rostrally. They appear to play a role in defining the ipsilateral projection by altering expression of Zic2 and EphB1 receptor production.

=== Growth in the optic tract ===
Once out of the optic chiasm, RGCs will extend dorsocaudally along the ventral diencephalic surface making the optic tract, which will guide them to the superior colliculus and lateral geniculate nucleus in the mammals, or the tectum in lower vertebrates. Sema3d seems to be promote growth, at least in the proximal optic tract, and cytoskeletal re-arrangements at the level of the growth cone appear to be significant.

== Myelination ==
In most mammals, the axons of retinal ganglion cells are not myelinated where they pass through the retina. However, the parts of axons that are beyond the retina, are myelinated. This myelination pattern is functionally explained by the relatively high opacity of myelin—myelinated axons passing over the retina would absorb some of the light before it reaches the photoreceptor layer, reducing the quality of vision. There are human eye diseases where this does, in fact, happen. In some vertebrates, such as the chicken, the ganglion cell axons are myelinated inside the retina.

== See also ==
- Ganglion cell
- Receptive field
