= Dyslexia-associated protein =

Protein found in humans

KIAA0319

Identifiers
- Aliases: KIAA0319, DYLX2, DYX2, NMIG
- External IDs: OMIM: 609269; MGI: 3036268; GeneCards: KIAA0319
Available structures
PDB	Ortholog search: PDBe RCSB
PDB	List of PDB id codes 2E7M

Gene location (Human)
Chr.	Chromosome 6 (human)
Band	6p22.3	Start	24,544,104 bp
Band	6p22.3	End	24,646,191 bp

Gene location (Mouse)
Chr.	Chromosome 13 (mouse)
Band	13|13 A3.1	Start	25,029,118 bp
Band	13|13 A3.1	End	25,085,253 bp
RNA expression pattern
Bgee	Human / Mouse (ortholog); Top expressed in: middle temporal gyrus; Brodmann area 23; gonad; primary visual cortex; endothelial cell; entorhinal cortex; Brodmann area 9; superior frontal gyrus; prefrontal cortex; lateral nuclear group of thalamus / Top expressed in: lumbar spinal ganglion; ventromedial nucleus; olfactory epithelium; lateral septal nucleus; primary motor cortex; paraventricular nucleus of hypothalamus; mammillary body; lateral hypothalamus; prefrontal cortex; cingulate gyrus; More reference expression data
BioGPS	n/a
Gene ontology
Molecular function	protein binding
Cellular component	integral component of membrane; endosome; early endosome; early endosome membrane; membrane; plasma membrane; clathrin-coated vesicle membrane; intracellular membrane-bounded organelle; cytoplasmic vesicle
Biological process	multicellular organism development; neuron migration; nervous system development; negative regulation of dendrite development; membrane organization
Sources:Amigo / QuickGO
Orthologs
Databases	NCBI: entry; OMA: entry
Species	Human	Mouse
Entrez	9856	210108
Ensembl	ENSG00000137261	ENSMUSG00000006711
UniProt	Q5VV43	Q5SZV5
RefSeq (mRNA)	NM_001168374; NM_001168375; NM_001168376; NM_001168377; NM_001252328 NM_014809; NM_001350403; NM_001350404; NM_001350405; NM_001350406; NM_001350407; NM_001350408; NM_001350409; NM_001350410	NM_001081051
RefSeq (protein)	NP_001161846; NP_001161847; NP_001161848; NP_001161849; NP_001239257 NP_055624; NP_001337332; NP_001337333; NP_001337334; NP_001337335; NP_001337336; NP_001337337; NP_001337338; NP_001337339	NP_001074520
Location (UCSC)	Chr 6: 24.54 – 24.65 Mb	Chr 13: 25.03 – 25.09 Mb
PubMed search
- Wikidata
View/Edit Human	View/Edit Mouse

Dyslexia-associated protein KIAA0319 is a protein which in humans is encoded by the KIAA0319 gene.

== Clinical significance ==
Variants of the KIAA0319 gene have been associated with developmental dyslexia. Reading disability, or dyslexia, is a major social, educational and mental health problem. In spite of average intelligence and adequate educational opportunities, 5–10% of school children have substantial reading deficits. Twin and family studies have shown a substantial genetic component to this disorder, with heritable variation estimated at 50–70%.

Mutations in the gene also more generally appear to play a key role in specific language impairment (SLI).

== Function ==
Over-expression of C-terminally myc-tagged KIAA0319 protein in transiently transfected 293T cells, showing plasma membrane localization. Detection with monoclonal anti-myc 9E10.

The KIAA0319 protein is expressed on the cell membrane and may be involved in neuronal migration. Furthermore, KIAA0319 follows a clathrin-mediated endocytic pathway.
