= Parvocellular cell =

Type of neuron located in the thalamus

Details
- Location: Lateral geniculate nucleus

Identifiers
- NeuroLex ID: nifext_43

In neuroscience, parvocellular cells, also called P-cells, are neurons located within the parvocellular layers of the lateral geniculate nucleus (LGN) of the thalamus. The name Parvocellular comes from Latin parvus 'small', due to the small size of the cell compared to the larger magnocellular cells. Phylogenetically, parvocellular neurons are more modern than magnocellular ones.

== Function ==
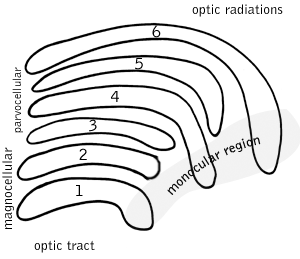
Schematic diagram of the primate LGN.

The parvocellular neurons of the visual system receive their input from midget cells, a type of retinal ganglion cell, whose axons comprise the optic tract. These synapses occur in one of the four dorsal parvocellular layers of the lateral geniculate nucleus. The information from each eye is kept separate at this point, and continues to be segregated until processing in the visual cortex. The electrically-encoded visual information leaves the parvocellular cells via relay cells in the optic radiations, traveling to the primary visual cortex layer 4C-β. The parvocellular neurons are sensitive to colour, and are more capable of discriminating fine details than their magnocellular counterparts. Parvocellular cells have greater spatial resolution, but lower temporal resolution, than the magnocellular cells.

== See also ==
- Koniocellular cell
- Magnocellular cell
- List of human cell types derived from the germ layers
- Parvocellular neurosecretory cell
- Parvocellular red nucleus
- Parvocellular reticular nucleus
