= Bistratified cell =

Type of cell within the eye

Bistratified cell or bistratified ganglion cell can refer to either of two kinds of retinal ganglion cells whose cell body is located in the ganglion cell layer of the retina:

- the small bistratified cell (SBC), also known as small-field bistratified ganglion cell
- the large bistratified cell (LBC) or large-field bistratified ganglion cell

Bistratified cells receive their input from bipolar cells and amacrine cells. The bistratified cells project their axons through the optic nerve and optic tract to the koniocellular layers in the lateral geniculate nucleus (LGN), synapsing with koniocellular cells. Koniocellular means "cells as small as dust"; their small size made them hard to find. About 8 to 10% of retinal ganglion cells are bistratified cells. They receive inputs from intermediate numbers of rods and cones. They have moderate spatial resolution, moderate conduction velocity, and can respond to moderate-contrast stimuli. They may be involved in color vision.

== See also ==
- Optic nerve (CN II)
- Optic tract
