= Wilbrand (name) =

Wilbrand is a German name. Notable people with the name include:

== Surname ==
- Julius Wilbrand (1839–1906), German chemist
- Johann Bernhard Wilbrand, German anatomist and naturalist
- Hermann Wilbrand (1851–1935), German ophthalmologist
- Franz Joseph Julius Wilbrand
- Tony Wilbrand (born 1983), American basketball player

== Given name ==
- Wilbrand of Oldenburg
- Wilbrand von Käfernburg
- Philipp Wilbrand Jacob Müller (1771–1851), German entomologist

== See also ==
- Wilbrandt
