= Willebrand (disambiguation) =

Erik Adolf von Willebrand (1870–1949) was a Finnish physician.

Willebrand, Willebrands, or Von Willebrand may refer to:

- Von Willebrand disease, a hereditary coagulation abnormality disease
- Von Willebrand factor, a blood glycoprotein involved in hemostasis
- Von Willebrand factor-cleaving protease, a.k.a. ADAMTS13, a zinc-containing metalloprotease enzyme
- Von Willebrand factor cleaving protease, a.k.a. ADAMTS13 endopeptidase, an enzyme
- Von Willebrand factor type A domain, a protein domain
- Von Willebrand factor type C domain, a protein domain
- Von Willebrand factor type D domain, a protein domain
- Von Willebrand factor A domain containing 7, a protein encoded by the VWA7 gene in humans
- Von Willebrand factor (medication), a.k.a. Vonicog alfa, a medication

== People ==
- Ernst Gustaf von Willebrand
- Johannes Willebrands (1909–2006), Dutch Catholic cardinal
- Julia Willebrand, American environmental, peace and education activist

== See also ==
- Wilbrand (disambiguation)
- Wilbrandt
- Willebrandt
- Willebrandts
