= Wilbrand (disambiguation) =

Julius Wilbrand (1839–1906) was a German chemist who discovered TNT.

Wilbrand may also refer to:

- Wilbrand (name)
- Wilbrand's knee – Anatomical landmark of the optic nerve
- Charcot–Wilbrand syndrome – Medical condition
- Wilbrandia – Genus of flowering plants

== See also ==
- Wilbrandt
- Willebrand (disambiguation)
- Willebrandt
