= List of decorated members of the 3rd Battalion, 3rd Marines =

This is a complete list of Marines from the 3rd Battalion 3rd Marine Regiment who have been awarded any of the United States's three highest military decorations for valor in combat – the Medal of Honor, the Navy Cross, or the Silver Star. A † after a recipient's name indicates that the award was given posthumously.

== World War II ==
Eight Marines from 3rd Battalion were awarded the Medal of Honor (1) or the Navy Cross (7) during World War II; six of these medals (Navy Crosses) were for actions during the Bougainville campaign and the other two (the Medal of Honor and one Navy Cross) were for actions during the Battle of Guam.

=== Medal of Honor ===
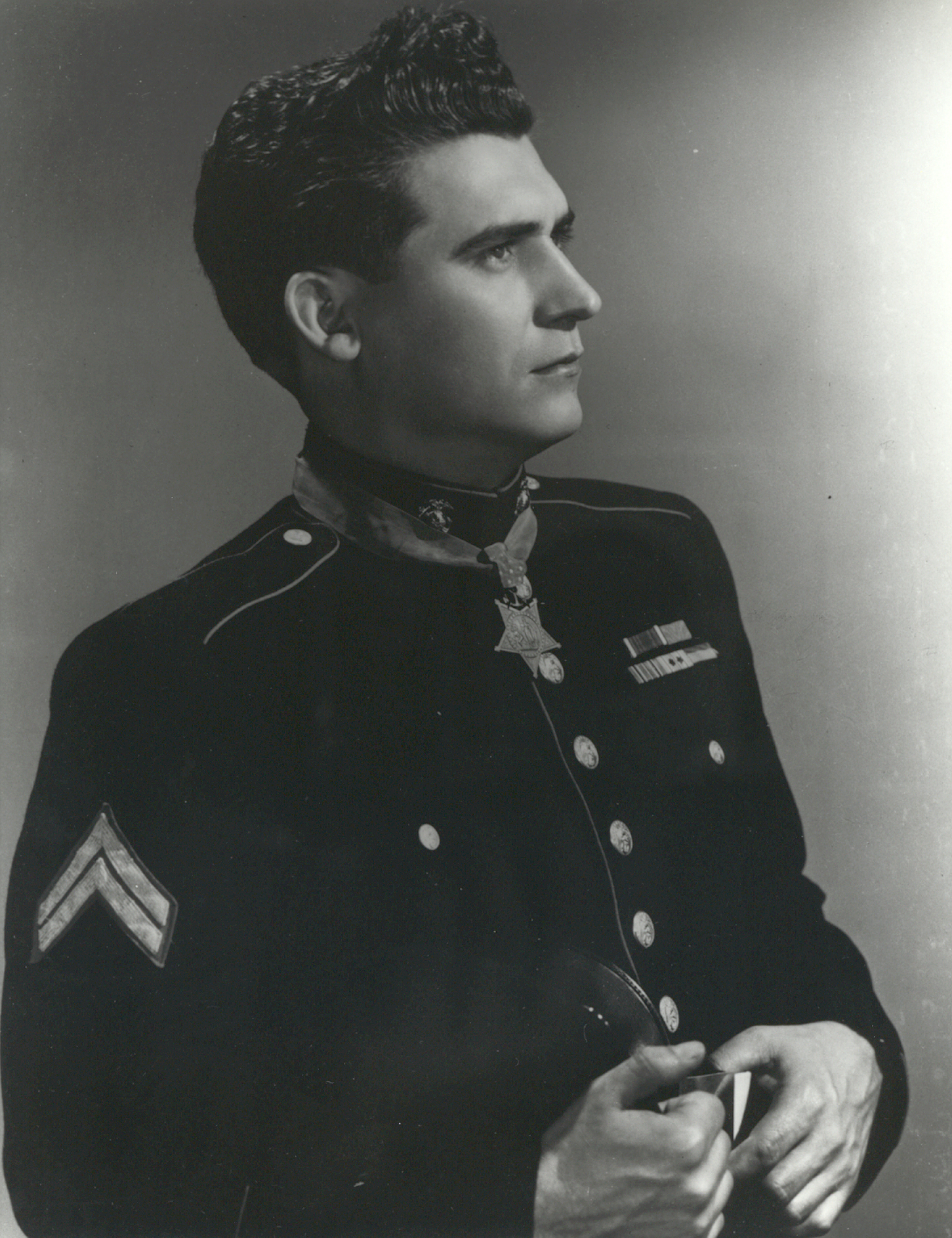
Luther Skaggs Jr.

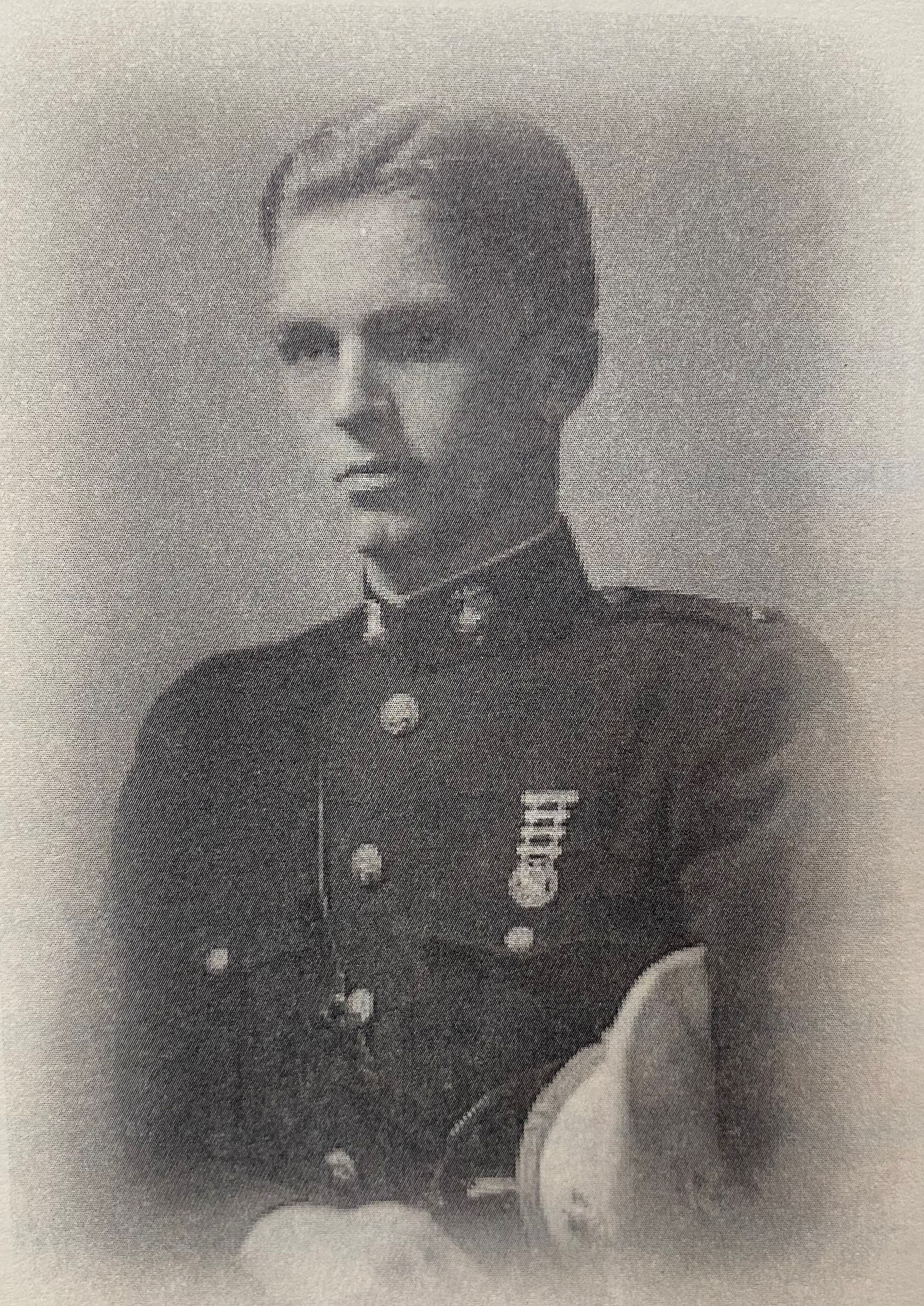
Paul Torian

Private Luther Skaggs Jr. received the Medal of Honor for his heroic actions on the beachhead on Guam during World War II. After the section leader became a casualty, Skaggs took over command and led the section through heavy enemy fire. Although wounded by a Japanese grenade that shattered the lower part of his leg, he continued to defend for a further eight hours through the night.

=== Navy Cross ===
James Beck
Rank and billet: Private, Rifleman
Organization: Company K
Date and place of action: 1943-11-22, Piva Forks, Bougainville Island
Entered service: Unknown
Birth: Unknown

Ralph Houser
Rank and billet: Lieutenant Colonel, Battalion Commander
Organization: H&S Company
Date and place of action: 1944-07-21 - 1944-07-23, Asan-Adelup Beachead, Guam
Entered service: 1935, Quantico, Virginia
Birth: 1914, Iowa City, Iowa
Death: 2001, Reston, Virginia

John Logan, Jr. †
Rank and billet: Corporal, Squad Leader
Organization: Company L
Date and place of action: 1943-11-24, Piva Forks, Bougainville Island
Entered service: Pittsburgh
Birth: Washington, D.C.
Death: 1943, Bougainville

Vernon Miller
Rank and billet: 1st Lieutenant, Platoon Commander
Organization: Machine Gun Platoon, Company K
Date and place of action: 1944-07-21 - 1944-07-23, Asan-Adelup Beachead, Guam
Entered service:
Birth:
Death:

Paul Torian
Rank and billet: Captain, Company Commander
Organization: Company K
Date and place of action: 1943-11-24, Piva Forks, Bougainville Island
Entered service: Evansville, Indiana
Birth: 1920, Evansville, Indiana
Death: 2004

Robert Turnbull †
Rank and billet: Captain, Company Commander
Organization: Company L
Date and place of action: 1943-11-24, Piva Forks, Bougainville Island
Entered service: Lawrenceville, Virginia
Birth: Lawrenceville, Virginia
Death: 1943, Bougainville campaign

James Luther Lee Jnr †
Citation: Bureau of Naval Personnel Information Bulletin No. 328 (July 1944)
Rank: Pharmacist's Mate Third Class
Company: Corpsman
Date and place of action: 1943-11-21, Piva Forks, Bougainville Island
Entered service: Austin, Texas
Born: September 8, 1924 at Fiskville, Texas
Hometown: Round Rock, Texas
Death: Killed in Action 1943-11-21, Piva Forks, Bougainville Island

== Vietnam War ==
=== Medal of Honor ===
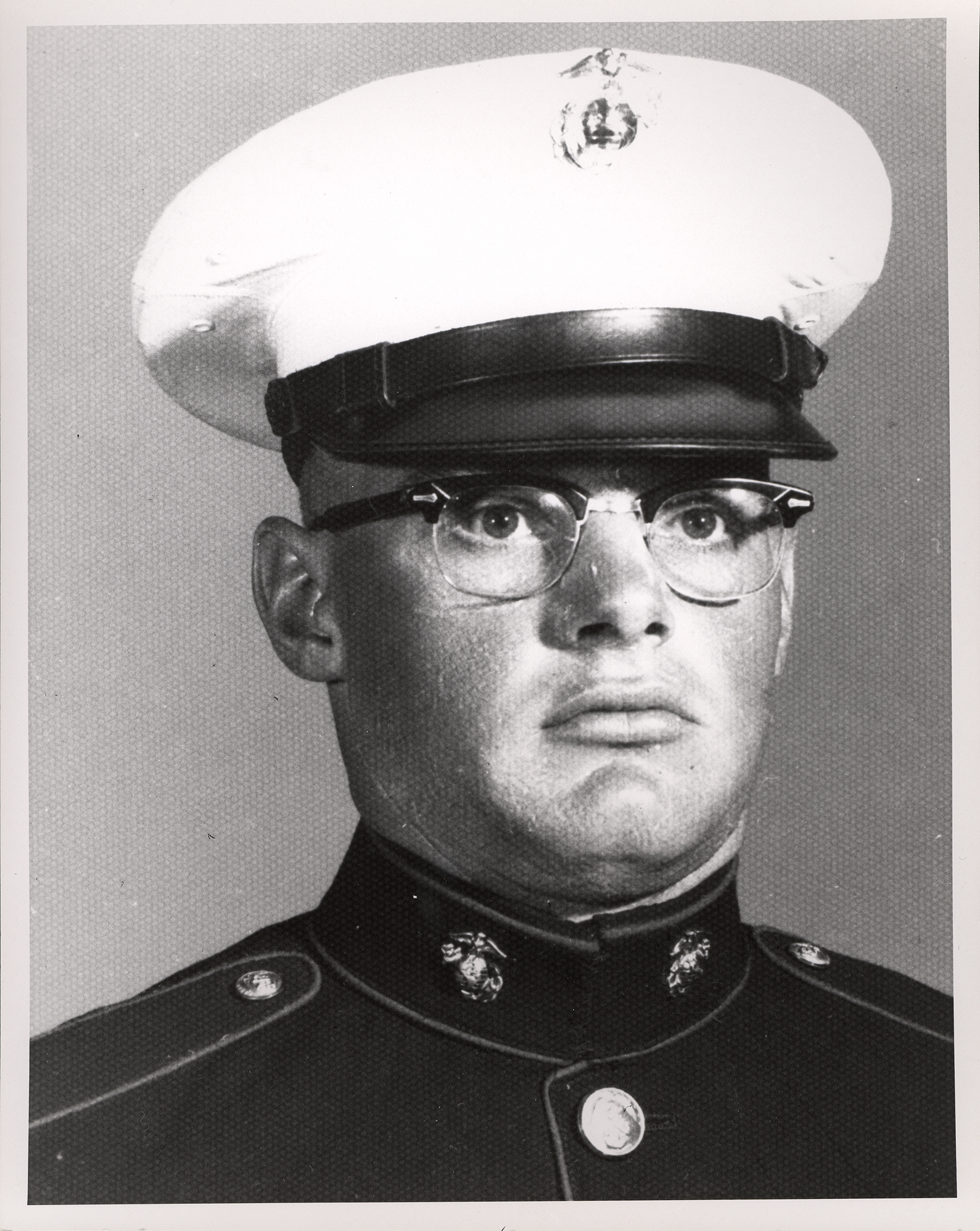
Ronald L. Coker

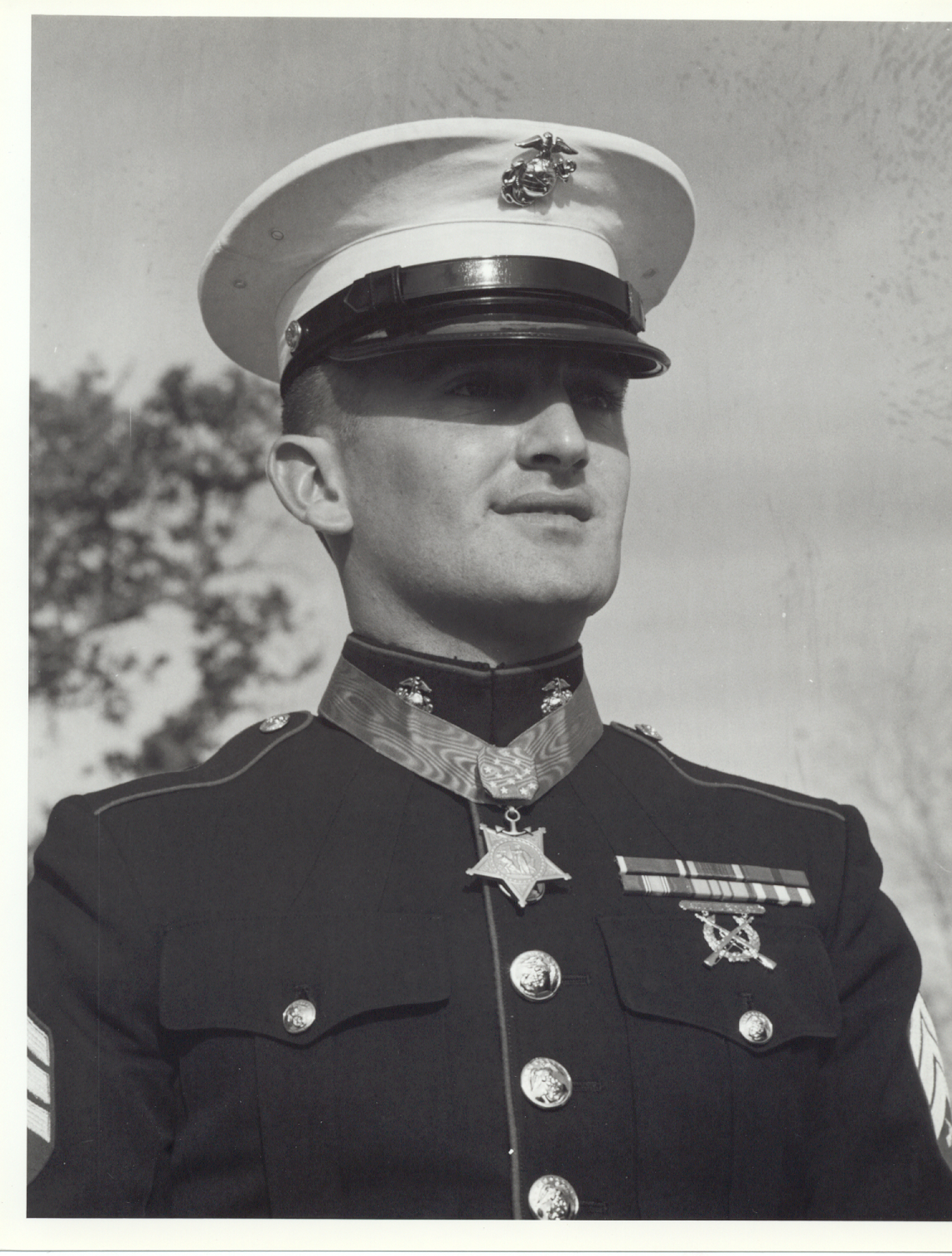
Robert O'Malley

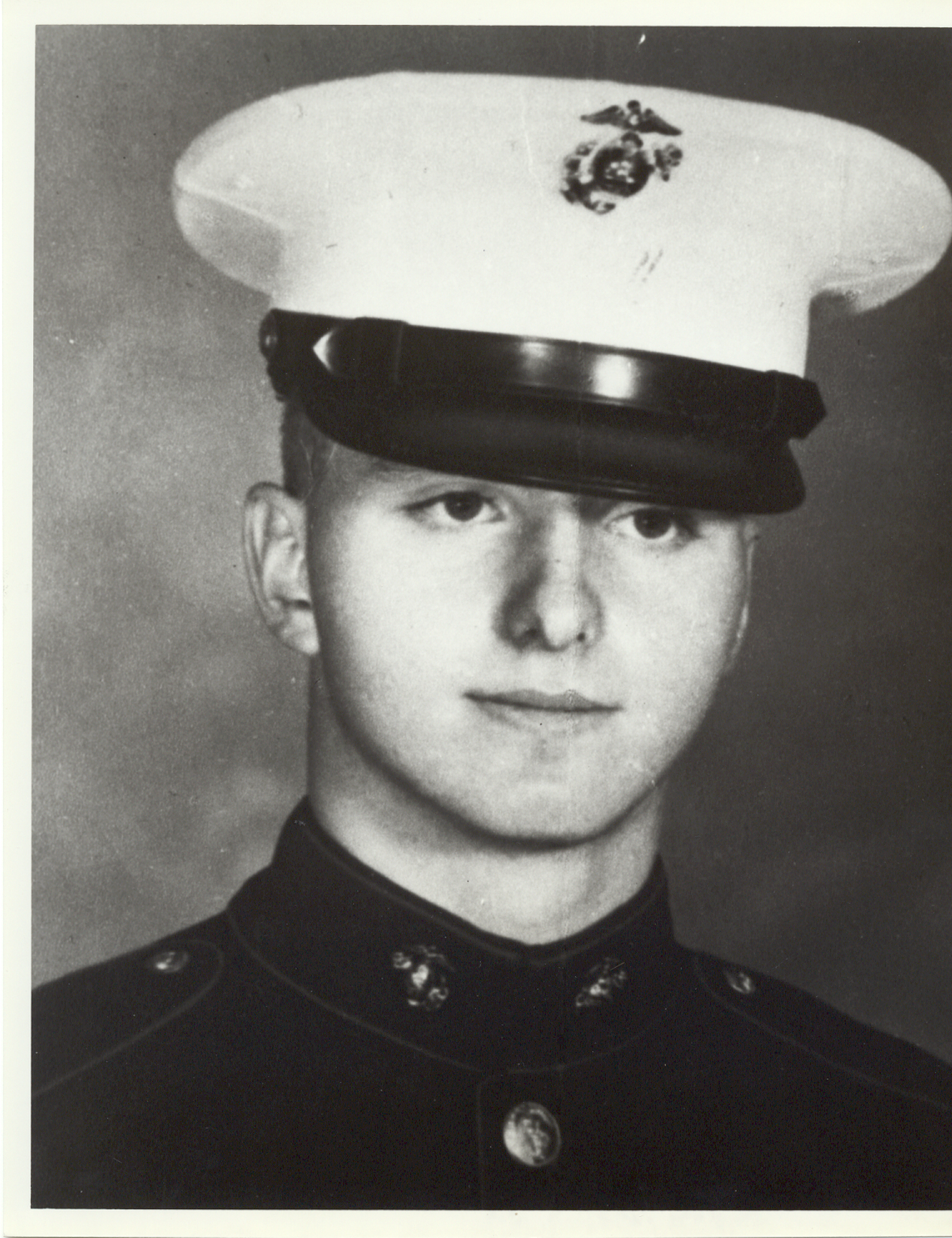
William Prom

Ronald L. Coker †
Rank and billet: Private First Class, Rifleman
Organization: Company M
Date and place of action: 1969-03-24, Quảng Trị province, Republic of Vietnam
Entered service: 1968-04-16, Denver
Birth: 1947-08-09, Alliance, Nebraska
Death: 1969-03-24, Quảng Trị province

Robert O'Malley
Rank and billet: Corporal, Squad Leader
Organization: Company I
Date and place of action: 1965-08-18, Operation Starlite, Republic of Vietnam
Entered service: 1961-10-11, New York City
Birth: 1943-06-03, New York City
Death: N/A

William Prom †
Rank and billet: Lance Corporal, Machine Gunner
Organization: Machine Gun Section, Company I
Date and place of action: 1969-02-09, Near An Hoa, Republic of Vietnam
Entered service: 1967-12-27, Pittsburgh
Birth: 1948-11-17, Pittsburgh
Death: 1969-02-09, Near Hội An

=== Navy Cross ===
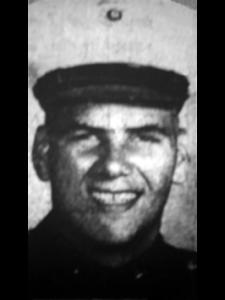
Edward Day

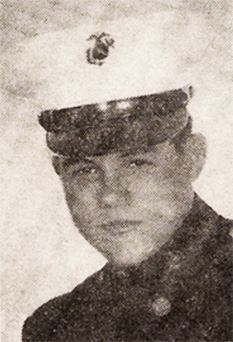
Grover Dickson

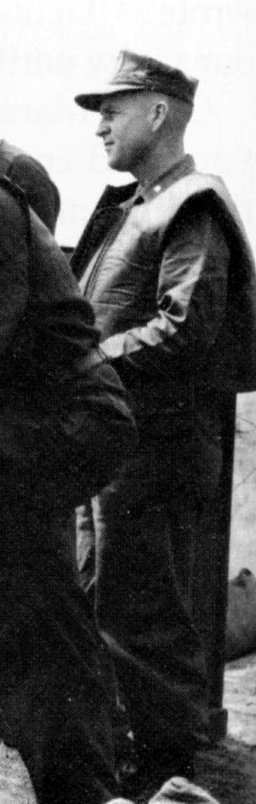
Joseph Muir

James Mulloy

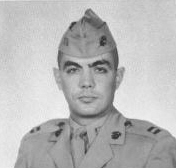
Bruce Webb

Joseph Muir
Rank and billet: Lieutenant Colonel, Battalion Commander
Organization: H&S Company
Date and place of action: 1965-08-18 to 1965-08-24, Operation Starlite, Republic of Vietnam
Entered service: Unknown
Birth: 1948-06-08, New York City
Death: 1965-09-11, Da Nang, Republic of Vietnam

Bruce Webb †
Rank and billet: Captain, Company Commander
Organization: Company I
Date and place of action: 1965-08-18, Operation Starlite, Republic of Vietnam
Entered service: Unknown
Birth: 1933-11-10, Wheaton, Illinois
Death: 1965-08-18, Republic of Vietnam

James Mulloy
Rank and billet: Sergeant, Supply NCO
Organization: H&S Company
Date and place of action: 1965-08-18, Operation Starlite, Republic of Vietnam
Entered service: Unknown
Birth: Unknown
Death:

Robert Moe
Rank and billet: Staff Sergeant, Platoon Commander
Organization: Company L, 3rd Platoon
Date and place of action: 1965-12-09, Quang Tin Province, Republic of Vietnam
Entered service: Unknown
Birth: Unknown
Death:

Grover Dickson †
Rank and billet: Corporal, Squad Leader
Organization: Company K, 2nd Platoon
Date and place of action: 1966-11-11, Operation Prairie, Republic of Vietnam
Entered service: New Orleans
Birth: 1938-03-15, Fort Worth, Texas
Death: 1966-11-11, Republic of Vietnam

James Kelly †
Rank and billet: Corporal, Grenadier
Organization: Company I
Date and place of action: 1967-03-24, An Hoa, Republic of Vietnam
Entered service: Sacramento, California
Birth: 1945-03-12
Death: 1967-03-24, Republic of Vietnam

Louis Pichon †
Rank and billet: Gunnery Sergeant, Company Gunnery Sergeant
Organization: Company I
Date and place of action: 1967-03-24, Cam Lo, Republic of Vietnam
Entered service: Slidell, Louisiana
Birth: Unknown
Death: 1967-03-24, Republic of Vietnam

Robert Schley †
Rank and billet: Corporal, Machine Gun Team Leader
Organization: Company M
Date and place of action: 1967-04-30, Battle of Hill 881, Republic of Vietnam
Entered service: Unknown
Birth: 1944-01-21, Oregon, Wisconsin
Death: 1967-04-30, Republic of Vietnam

Terrance Meier †
Rank and billet: Staff Sergeant, Platoon Sergeant
Organization: Company M, 2nd Platoon
Date and place of action: 1967-07-21, Ca Lu, Republic of Vietnam
Entered service: Portland, Oregon
Birth: Unknown
Death: 1967-07-21, Republic of Vietnam

Robert Lee Quick †
Rank and billet: Private First Class, Rifleman
Organization: Company K
Date and place of action: 1968-02-07, Gio Linh, Republic of Vietnam
Entered service: Wallaceton, Pennsylvania
Birth: Unknown
Death: 1968-02-07, Republic of Vietnam

Edward Day †
Rank and billet: Lance Corporal, Squad Leader
Organization: Company L
Date and place of action: 1968-08-26, The Rockpile, Republic of Vietnam
Entered service: Philadelphia
Birth: 1949-07-12
Death: 1968-08-26, Republic of Vietnam

Vernon Yarber †
Rank and billet: Lance Corporal, Squad Leader
Organization: Company L
Date and place of action: 1968-08-26, The Rockpile, Republic of Vietnam
Entered service: Jacksonville, Florida
Birth:
Death: 1968-08-26, Republic of Vietnam

Robert Dalton
Rank and billet: Corporal, Squad Leader
Organization: Company K
Date and place of action: 1969-05-25, Vietnamese Demilitarized Zone, Republic of Vietnam
Entered service: Unknown
Birth: Unknown
Death:

Roger Rosenberger †
Rank and billet: Private First Class, Rifleman
Organization: Company M
Date and place of action: 1969-06-17, Dong Ha, Republic of Vietnam
Entered service: Swartz Creek, Michigan
Birth: 1950-07-29
Death: 1969-06-17, Republic of Vietnam

James McWhorter †
Rank and billet: Lance Corporal, Squad Leader
Organization: Company L, 3rd Platoon
Date and place of action: 1969-08-22, Quang Tri Province, Republic of Vietnam
Entered service: Beaverton, Oregon
Birth: Unknown
Death: 1969-08-22, Republic of Vietnam

Terrence Kierznowski †
Rank and billet: Hospital Corpsman Second Class
Organization: US Navy, attached to Company K (Note: While Hospital Corpsman is an enlisted medical specialist of the United States Navy, they are a fully shared resource with the Marine Corps, many serving as battlefield corpsmen with the Marines. Corpsman Kierznowski saved the life of a wounded Marine from three mortar rounds by shielding him with his own body.)
Date and place of action: 1969-09-12, Quang Tri Province, Republic of Vietnam
Entered service: Crete, Illinois
Birth: Unknown
Death: 1969-09-12, Republic of Vietnam

=== Silver Star ===
Lance Corporal David W. Cutshall: "For conspicuous gallantry and intrepidity in action while serving as a Machine Gun Team Leader with Company M, Third Battalion, Third Marines, Third Marine Division. On 6 March 1968, during a company-size operation near Con Thien, Lance Corporal Cutshall's platoon came under intense enemy automatic weapons, mortar and artillery fire from a well entrenched battalion of North Vietnamese Army Regulars. Observing enemy movement through the brush, he marked the area with machine gun tracer rounds which enabled an anti-tank assault team to destroy an enemy bunker with rocket fire. Throughout the five-hour fire fight, he maintained a critical position and directed highly effective machine gun fire upon the enemy. Ordered to withdraw to a more advantageous position, he provided covering fire for his companions as they moved to join their platoon. While preparing to throw a hand grenade, Lance Corporal Cutshall was severely wounded by enemy grenade fragments which caused him to drop his grenade. Without regard for his own safety, he immediately fell upon the activated grenade to shield his companions. Although he was killed when it exploded, he undoubtedly saved the lives of his three companions. By his extraordinary courage, bold initiative and selfless devotion to duty, Lance Corporal Cutshall upheld the highest traditions of the United States Naval Service."

Lance Corporal Dennis Scalici, a fire team leader with Lima Company, received two Silver Stars within a four-month period.

Lance Corporal Timothy Gene Carter †, Mortar Team Leader, was awarded the Silver Star along with 6 other medals posthumously (1969). Carter was the highest decorated Marine from Nevada of the Vietnam War. A mortar range in Hawthorne, Nevada, bears his name.

Sergeant Laurence Eugene Belko, with India Company, was awarded a Silver Star in May 1968 for coordinating a five-hour rescue of his comrades in Dong Ha, while wounded and under enemy fire.

Lance Corporal John R. Eron "The President of the United States of America takes pleasure in presenting the Silver Star to Corporal John R. Eron (MCSN: 2277659), United States Marine Corps, for conspicuous gallantry and intrepidity in action while serving as a Squad Leader with Company M, Third Battalion, Third Marines, THIRD Marine Division in connection with operations against the enemy in the Republic of Vietnam. On 16 March 1968, Lance Corporal Eron’s unit was conducting a search and destroy operation near Con Thien when the Marines suddenly came under intense hostile fire from a numerically superior North Vietnamese Army force. Reacting instantly, Lance Corporal Eron directed his men’s fire into the hostile emplacements and silenced the enemy fire. As he maneuvered his squad forward toward a tree line, the unit again came under intense fire and several men were wounded. Realizing the seriousness of the situation, he immediately delivered a heavy volume of fire at the enemy emplacements and directed his men to withdraw to covered positions. Under covering fire from his men, he unhesitatingly moved about the fire-swept terrain and carried the casualties to relatively safe positions. As he moved the wound men from the hazardous area, he threw hand grenades into the hostile emplacements and personally accounted for several enemy soldiers confirmed killed. Ignoring the enemy rounds impacting near him, Lance Corporal Eron skillfully administered first aid to the injured men while simultaneously directing his men’s fire at the enemy force. By his courage, superb leadership and unwavering devotion to duty in the face of great personal danger, Lance Corporal Eron undoubtedly saved the lives of several Marines and upheld the highest traditions of the Marine Corps and of the United States Naval Service."

== Afghan War ==
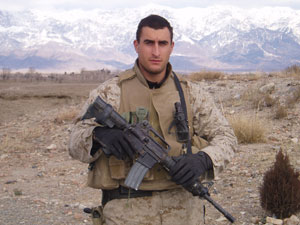
1st Lieutenant Stephen Boada

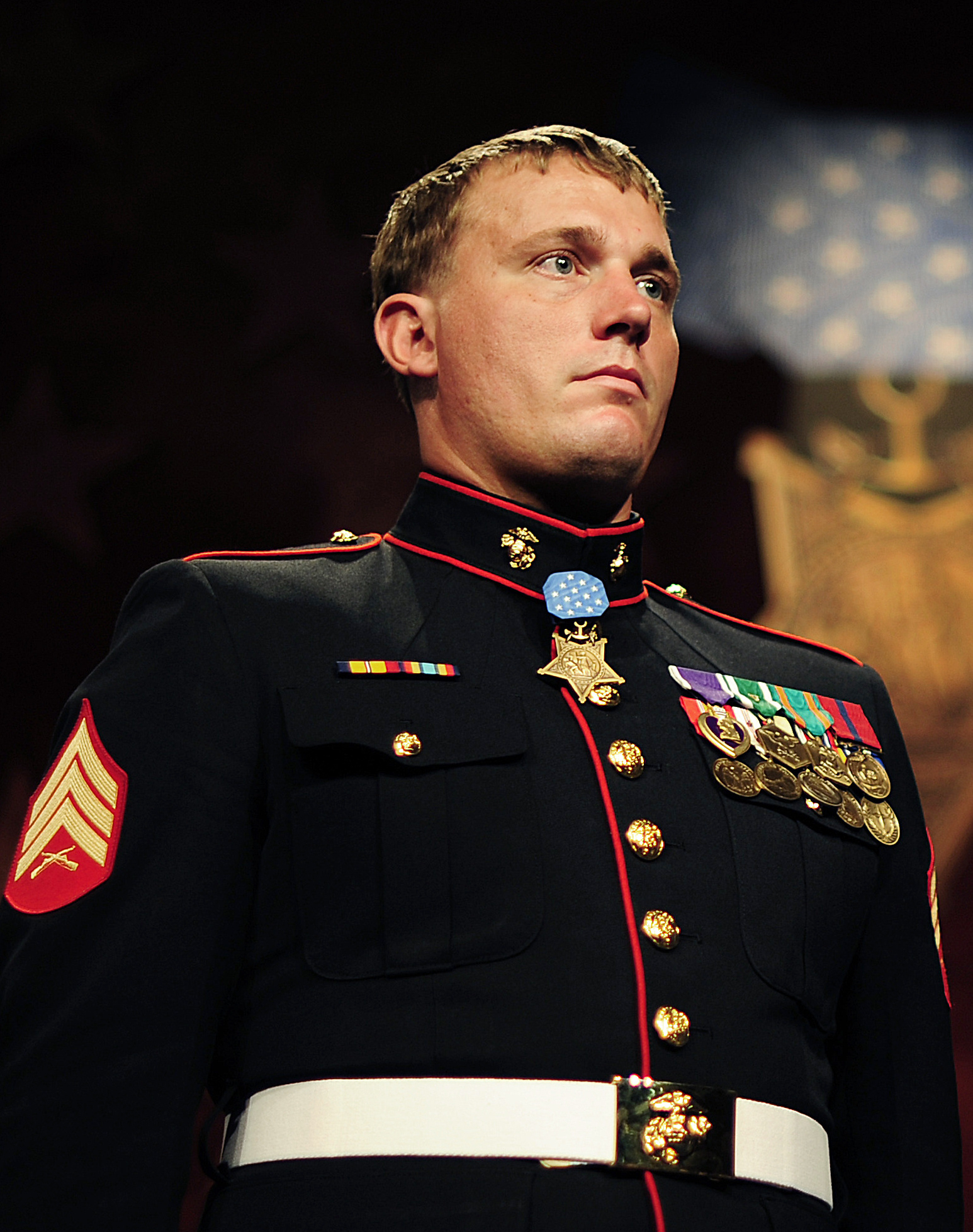
Corporal Dakota Meyer

=== Medal of Honor ===
As of March 2022, only one Marine from Third Battalion has been awarded the Medal of Honor for actions in the Afghanistan.

Dakota Meyer
Rank and billet: Corporal
Organization: Embedded Training Team 2-8
Date and place of action: 2008-09-08, Kunar province, Afghanistan
Entered service: Greensburg, Kentucky
Birth: Greensburg, Kentucky

=== Silver Star ===
As of March 2022, only one Marine from Third Battalion has been awarded the Silver Star for actions in Afghanistan.

Stephen Boada
Rank and billet: 1st Lieutenant, Forward Air Controller
Organization: Company K, 2nd Platoon
Date and place of action: 2005-05-05 - 2005-05-09, Shatagal Village, Afghanistan
Entered service: Bristol, Connecticut
Birth: Bristol, Connecticut

== Statistics ==
Parentheses indicate number of times award was posthumous.

Conflict	Year	Medal of Honor	Navy Cross	Silver Star
World War II	1943	0	4(2)	????
World War II	1944	1	2	????
Vietnam War	1965	1	4(1)	10(?)
Vietnam War	1966	0	1(1)	6(?)
Vietnam War	1967	0	4(4)	27(?)
Vietnam War	1968	0	3(3)	27(?)
Vietnam War	1969	2(2)	4(3)	32(?)
Afghan War	2005-2009	1	0	1
