= Leslie Stull =

American politician (1908–1992)

Member of the Nebraska Legislature from the 49th district
- In office January 6, 1969 – January 5, 1977
- Preceded by: George Gerdes
- Succeeded by: Samuel Cullan

Personal details
- Born: January 20, 1908 Diller, Nebraska
- Died: April 27, 1992 (aged 84) near Alliance, Nebraska
- Party: Republican
- Spouse: Dorothy Magnuson (m. 1932)
- Children: 6 (Donald, Marian, Jacqueline, David, Richard, Cheryl)
- Occupation: Farmer, rancher

Leslie A. Stull (January 20, 1908 – April 27, 1992) was a Republican politician from Nebraska who served as a member of the Nebraska Legislature from the 49th district from 1969 to 1977, and on the Box Butte County Commission from 1949 to 1969 and 1979 to 1991.

== Early life ==
Stull was born in Diller, Nebraska, in 1908, and graduated from Diller High School. He was a farmer in Alliance, where he maintained a herd of dairy cattle and operated the county poor farm for several years.

In 1949, Stull was appointed to the Box Butte County Commission in the 2nd district following the death of Commissioner Joe Nitsch. He ran for a full term in 1950, and won the Republican primary over Emmett Swanson. He was unopposed in the general election. Stull won the Republican primary in 1954 over Robert Mundt, and was unopposed again in the general election, and was re-elected without any opposition in 1958.

Stull ran for a fourth full term in 1962, and was challenged by Democratic nominee Fred Hale, a farmer. He won the general election by a wide margin over Hale. He was re-elected unopposed in 1966.

== Nebraska Legislature ==
In 1968, State Senator George Gerdes ran for re-election to a fifth term, and Stull challenged him in the 49th district, which included Box Butte, Dawes, Morrill County, Nebraska, and Sioux counties. Gerdes and Stull were joined in the primary election by Albert Reimenschneider, a conductor for the Chicago and North Western Railway. In the nonpartisan primary, Gerdes placed first, winning 44 percent of the vote to Stull's 38 percent and Riemenschneider's 18 percent, and Gerdes and Stull advanced to the general election. On election night, Stull finished slightly ahead of Gerdes, and the final canvass confirmed that Stull won by 98 votes.

Stull ran for re-election in 1972, and was challenged by Kenny Hutson, an auctioneer and businessman. Stull placed first in the primary election by a wide margin, winning 69 percent of the vote to Hutson's 31 percent. In the general election, Stull defeated Hutson in a landslide, winning 61–39 percent.

In 1976, Stull ran for re-election to a third term. He was challenged by Samuel Cullan, a former resident of the district who was a senior at the U.S. Merchant Marine Academy. In the primary election, Stull received 63 percent of the vote to Stull's 37 percent. During the general election campaign, Cullan launched an aggressive "door-to-door campaign," and narrowly defeated Stull in a "surprise upset." Stull received 47 percent of the vote to Cullen's 53 percent.

== Post-legislative career ==
After leaving the legislature, Stull launched a campaign for an at-large seat on the Box Butte County Commission. Stull and Gene Gerdes, the son of George Gerdes, won the Republican primary unopposed. They faced incumbent County Commissioner Clifford Batels and Relph Lockridge, the Democratic nominees, in the general election, which Stull and Bartels won.

In 1982, Stull ran for re-election. He and farmer Fred Specht won the Republican primary, and faced the Democratic nominees, Bartels and retired railroad worker J. O. Butcher, in the general election. Stull and Bartels won the general election.

Stull ran for a third term in 1986, and won the Republican primary unopposed with Alliance City Councilman Dick Zellaha. In the general election, Stull and Bartels won, with Zellaha placing third. He did not seek a fourth consecutive term in 1990.

== Death ==
Stull died on April 27, 1992, near his farm in Alliance.
