= J. Monroe Bixler =

American politician (1917–1991)

Member of the Nebraska Legislature from the 41st district
- In office January 6, 1953 – January 6, 1959
- Preceded by: William Hern
- Succeeded by: George Gerdes

Personal details
- Born: February 28, 1917 Alliance, Nebraska
- Died: June 10, 1991 (aged 74) Las Vegas, Nevada
- Party: Republican
- Spouse: Merry Echo Gillette
- Children: 2
- Education: Dana College (A.B.); University of Nebraska College of Law
- Occupation: Rancher, hotelier

Military service
- Allegiance: United States
- Branch/service: United States Army Air Corps

James Monroe Bixler (February 28, 1917 – June 10, 1991) was a Republican politician from Nebraska who served as a member of the Nebraska Legislature from the 41st district from 1953 to 1959. He was the Republican nominee for Nebraska State Treasurer in 1958.

Bixler was born in Alliance, Nebraska, in 1917, and graduated from Sioux County High School. He attended Blair College and later the University of Nebraska College of Law, and served in the United States Army Air Corps during World War II. Upon settling in Harrison, he was a rancher and served on the municipal school board.

In 1952, Bixler challenged State Senator William Hern for re-election in the 41st district, and defeated him by a wide margin. He was re-elected in 1954 and 1956.

Bixler ran for Nebraska State Treasurer in 1958. In an upset, Bixler lost to Richard Larsen, the Democratic nominee and political unknown. Though Bixler initially pursued a recount, he later suspended his contest of the result and conceded defeat. He ran for the U.S. House of Representatives in 1960 from the 4th district, but lost the Republican primary to David Martin.

He died on June 10, 1991.
