= George Gerdes =

George Gerdes may refer to:

- George Gerdes (actor) (1948–2021), American singer-songerwriter and character actor
- George Gerdes (politician) (1898–1973), American politician from Nebraska
