= Harry Gantz =

American politician (1886–1972)

Member of the Nebraska Legislature from the 41st district
- In office January 5, 1937 – January 2, 1945
- Preceded by: Position established
- Succeeded by: William Hern

Personal details
- Born: May 20, 1886 Osborne County, Kansas
- Died: May 20, 1972 (aged 86) Alliance, Nebraska
- Party: Democratic
- Spouse: Pearl Mitchell (m. 1908; died 1958)
- Education: Creighton University School of Law (LL.B.)
- Occupation: Attorney

Harry E. Gantz (May 20, 1886 – May 20, 1972) was a Democratic politician from Nebraska who served as a member of the Nebraska Legislature from the 41st district from 1937 to 1945.

Gantz was born in Osborne County, Kansas, in 1886, and moved to Alliance, Nebraska, in 1905. He received his bachelor of laws degree from Creighton University in 1916, and practiced as an attorney in Alliance and served on the city school board.

In 1936, Gantz was elected to the Nebraska Legislature from the 41st district, and was re-elected in 1938, 1940, and 1942. He considered running for governor in 1944, but ultimately declined to do so, and did not seek a fifth term in the legislature.

After leaving the legislature, he served as chairman of the Box Butte County Democratic Party, but resigned in 1947 to focus on his legal practice. He died on May 20, 1972, on his eighty-sixth birthday.
