= Samuel Cullan =

American politician

Member of the Nebraska Legislature from the 49th district
- In office January 5, 1977 – November 1, 1983
- Preceded by: Leslie Stull
- Succeeded by: Sandra K. Scofield

Personal details
- Born: June 20, 1954 (age 72) Hemingford, Nebraska
- Party: Independent (1976–1980); Republican (1972–1976, 1980–present)
- Education: United States Merchant Marine Academy (B.S.); Creighton University School of Law (J.D.); Creighton University School of Medicine (M.D.)
- Occupation: Attorney

Samuel K. Cullan (born June 20, 1954) is an American politician and attorney from Nebraska who served as a member of the Nebraska Legislature from the 49th district from 1977 to 1983. He was initially an independent but joined the Republican Party in 1980.

== Early life ==
Cullan was born in Hemingford, Nebraska, in 1954. He grew up in Hemingford, and attended St. Agnes Academy in Alliance and graduated from Hemingford High School in 1972. Cullan was nominated for the United States Merchant Marine Academy by Senator Carl Curtis, and enrolled later that year. Cullan graduated from the Merchant Marine Academy in 1976.

== Nebraska Legislature ==
In 1976, State Senator Leslie Stull, who represented the western Nebraska-based 49th district, ran for re-election to a third term, Cullan, a senior at the Merchant Marine Academy at the time, announced that he would challenge Stull for re-election. Cullan, who had originally registered to vote as a Republican, switched his party registration to independent prior to challenging Stull. Cullan campaigned little in the district prior to his graduation, and Stull placed first in the primary election by a wide margin, winning 63 percent of the vote to Cullen's 37 percent. In the general election, Cullan waged a "massive advertising and door-to-door campaign" against Stull, and ultimately defeated Stull in a "surprise upset," winning 53 percent of the vote to Stull's 47 percent.

During Cullen's first term in the legislature, he enrolled as a law student at the Creighton University School of Law in the fall of 1979. He switched to the Republican Party in 1980, characterizing himself as a moderate-conservative, and noting that, because "Nebraska is a two-party state," if he was "involved in the Legislature, I have to function in the system." Cullan ran for re-election in 1980, and was re-elected unopposed.

He graduated from law school in 1982, and was sworn in as an attorney by Chief Justice Norman Krivosha of the Nebraska Supreme Court on September 17, 1982. He joined his brothers, Dave and Dan Cullan, in their legal practice. On August 11, 1983, Cullan announced that he would resign from the legislature, effective November 1, to attend the Creighton University School of Medicine.

== Post-legislative career ==
Cullan graduated from medical school in 1987, and practices as an attorney.
