= Carl Friedrich Richard Förster =

German ophthalmologist (1825–1902)

Carl Friedrich Richard Förster (15 November 1825 – 7 July 1902) was a German ophthalmologist born in the town of Lissa (today Leszno, Poland).

He received his medical doctorate in 1849, and for most of his career was associated with the University of Breslau. Two of his assistants at Breslau were Hermann Wilbrand (1851–1935) and Hermann Rudolph Aubert (1826–1892).

Förster is remembered for conducting tests of visual acuity, and for his investigations of indirect vision (peripheral vision) and visual performance across the visual field together with Hermann Aubert. The linear variation of visual performance that they described is sometimes referred to as the Aubert-Foerster law. From Förster's research, the eponymous terms of "Förster perimeter" and "Förster's shift" are derived. A Förster perimeter was an instrument used to measure an individual's field of vision. He also devised a specialized photometer to determine the smallest amount of light that will permit an object to be visible.

In 1871 Förster defined the difference between negative and positive scotoma (blind spot); if vision of the scotoma region is a void, it is a negative scotoma, and if the scotoma is an area of darkness/lightness or composed of hallucinatory patterns, it is called a positive scotoma.

== Written works ==
- Beiträge zur Kenntniss des indirecten Sehens. Albrecht von Graefe's Archiv für Ophthalmologie, Berlin, 1857, 3: 167, Aubert, R. F. Foerster.
- Ophtalmologische Beiträge. Berlin, 1862.
- Beziehungen der Allgemein-Leiden und Organ-Erkrankungen zu Veränderungen und Erkrankungen des Sehorgans. In: Edwin Theodor Saemisch and Alfred Carl Graefe: Handbuch der gesammten Augenheilkunde. Leipzig 1877, 7, Theil 5, pp. 59–234.
- Lichtsinn bei Krankheiten der Chorioidea und Retina. Klin Mbl Augenheilk 1871; 9: 337-346.
- Künstliche Reifung des Cataracts. Hermann Jakob Knapp’s Archiv für Augenheilkunde, Wiesbaden, 1883.
- Verbreitung der Cholera durch die Brunnen. Carl Wilhelm von Zehender’s Klinische Monatsblätter für Augenheilkunde, Stuttgart, 1873.
- Das Wasser als Träger des Choleragiftes. Küchenmeister’s Zeitschrift für Epidemiologie und öffentliche Gesundheitspflege, Darmstadt and Leipzig, 1874.
- Einfluss der Concavgläser auf die Weiterentwicklung der Myopie. Knapp’s Archiv für Augenheilkunde, Wiesbaden, XIV.
