= George Gerdes (politician) =

American politician (1898–1973)

Member of the Nebraska Legislature
- In office January 6, 1959 – January 6, 1969
- Preceded by: J. Monroe Bixler
- Succeeded by: Leslie Stull
- Constituency: 41st district (1959–1965); 49th district (1965–1969)

Personal details
- Born: September 28, 1898 Alliance, Nebraska
- Died: August 17, 1973 (aged 74) Alliance, Nebraska
- Party: Republican
- Spouse: Minnie Spetman (m. 1923; died 1957)
- Children: 2 (Gene, Gladys)
- Education: Nebraska College of Technical Agriculture
- Occupation: Rancher

George C. Gerdes (September 28, 1898 – August 17, 1973) was a Republican politician from Nebraska who served as a member of the Nebraska Legislature from 1959 to 1969.

== Early life ==
Gerdes was born in Alliance, Nebraska, in 1898. He graduated from the Nebraska School of Agriculture and served in World War I. Gerdes returned to Alliance and farmed wheat, serving as vice chairman of the Nebraska Wheat Growers Association. Gerdes was the chairman of the Panhandle Rural Electrification Membership Association, which helped bring electricity to rural areas in the Panhandle. He was active in the Nebraska Republican Party, and was elected as a delegate, along with his wife, to the post-primary county convention in 1956.

== Nebraska Legislature ==
In 1958, State Senator J. Monroe Bixler opted to run for State Treasurer rather than seek re-election. Gerdes ran to succeed him in the 41st district, which included Box Butte, Dawes, and Sioux counties. No candidates filed to run against him, and he was elected unopposed.

Gerdes was re-elected without opposition to a second term in 1960, and a third term in 1962.

In 1964, following redistricting, Gerdes ran for re-election in the 49th district. No candidates filed to run against him, and he was nominated without opposition at the primary election. However, a week before the general election, rancher Earl Henderson launched a write-in bid against Gerdes. Gerdes won re-election in a landslide, receiving 72 percent of the vote to Henderson's 28 percent.

Gerdes ran for a fifth term in 1968. He was challenged by Box Butte County Commissioner Leslie Stull and Chicago and North Western Railway conductor Albert Reimenschneider. Gerdes placed first in the primary election, receiving 44 percent of the vote, and he advanced to the general election with Stull, who placed second with 38 percent. Gerdes ultimately lost re-election to Stull by a narrow margin, receiving 98 fewer votes than him.

== Death ==
Gerdes died on August 17, 1973.
