= Hermann Rudolph Aubert =

German physiologist

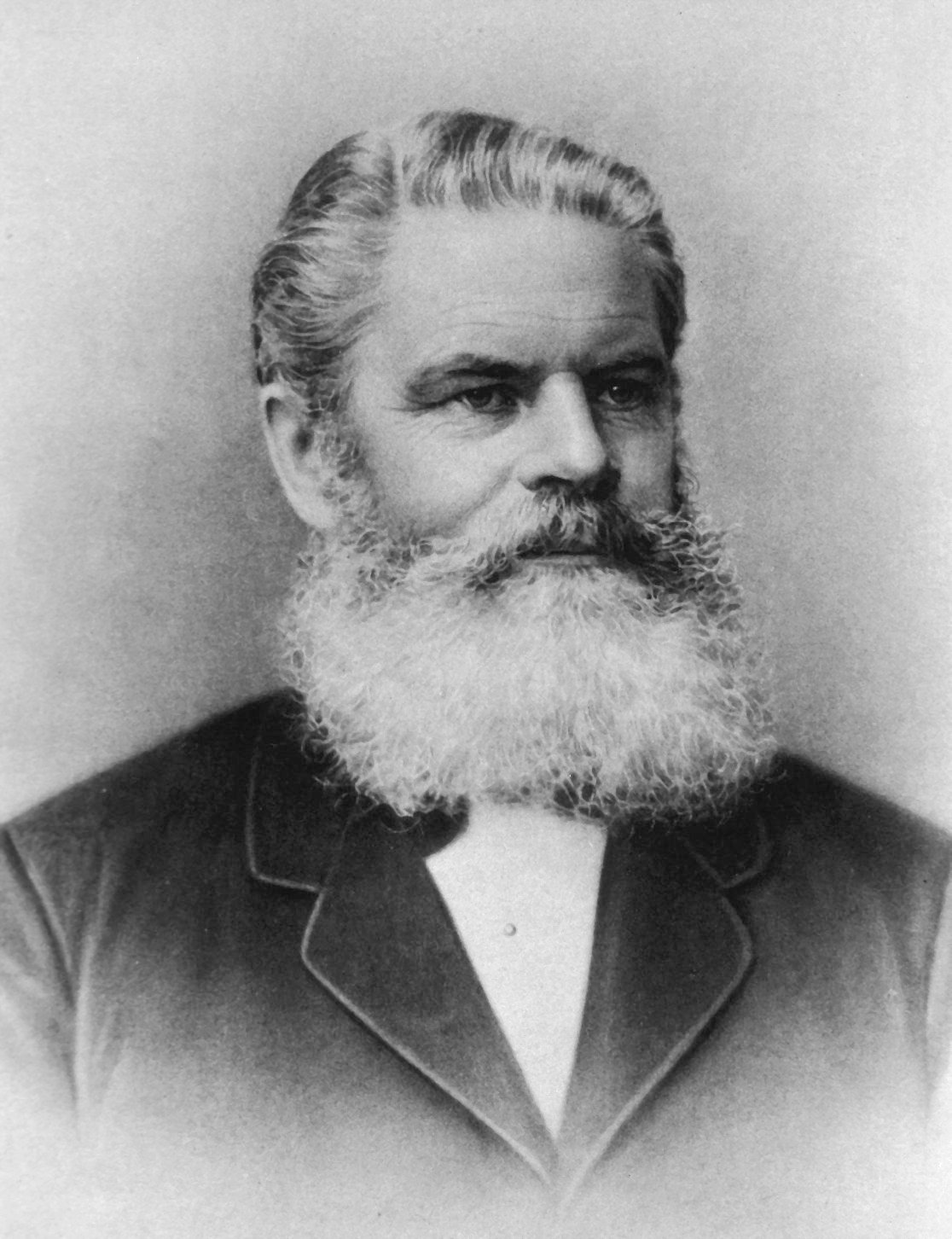
Hermann Rudolph Aubert

Hermann Rudolph Aubert (November 23, 1826 – February 12, 1892) was a German physiologist born in Frankfurt.

In 1850 he obtained his medical doctorate, afterwards serving as privat-docent of physiology at Breslau (1854). In 1862 he became an associate professor, later being appointed professor of physiology at the University of Rostock (1865).

Aubert is known for his research involving psychophysics, including the way an observer perceives pattern, movement and orientation. He conducted several experiments involving the phenomenon of dark adaptation; namely the eye's ability to regain its sensitivity in the dark after it had been exposed to bright lights.

With ophthalmologist Richard Förster (1825–1902), he performed a series of tests on vision outside the point of fixation, which they referred to as indirect vision. Their findings were published in a treatise called Beiträge zur Kenntniss des indirecten Sehens (1857). From their work the eponymous "Aubert-Förster law" is derived. Aubert and Förster's data showed that visual acuity changes between central and peripheral vision in an approximately linear fashion with the visual angle of eccentricity. Another eponym associated with him is "Aubert's phenomenon", an optical illusion involving the factual position of a subjective vertical line when an observer's head is tilted. This phenomenon is particularly evident in the dark.

His earlier work dealt with zoological issues, such as studies of Aspidogaster conchicola, and research involving the thorax muscles of insects. With botanist Friedrich Wimmer (1803–1868), he published a German edition of Aristotle's Historia Animalium.
