= Carl Behr =

German ophthalmologist (1874–1943)

Carl Julius Peter Behr (28 October 1874 – 16 November 1943) was a German ophthalmologist born in Hamburg. In 1909 he described an hereditary syndrome of optic and neurologic disorders now known as Behr's syndrome.

After attending several universities in Germany, he obtained his medical doctorate from the University of Kiel in 1900. Later he was an intern and assistant-physician at Eppendorf and St. Georg's hospitals in Hamburg. In 1910 he was habilitated for ophthalmology at Kiel, where in 1916 he became an associate professor. In 1923 he was appointed to the chair of ophthalmology at University of Hamburg.

Behr specialized in the study of neuro-ophthalmological disorders, making contributions in his research involving the pathological processes in papilloedema and tabetic optic atrophy. His name is lent to "Behr's pupil", a slightly dilated pupil in association with an optic tract lesion that is usually associated with a contralateral hemiparesis.

In 1933 Behr signed the Vow of allegiance of the Professors of the German Universities and High-Schools to Adolf Hitler and the National Socialistic State.

== Written works ==
Among his scientific publications was Der Augenbefund in seiner diagnostischen und differentialdiagnostischen Bedeutung bei Tabes dorsalis, Lues cerebrospinalis, Multipler Sklerose (1936), a neuro-ophthalmological analysis of eye disorders and their differential diagnostic relevance in tabes dorsalis, lues cerebrospinalis and multiple sclerosis. Other noteworthy written works by Behr include:

- Die Lehre von den Pupillenbewegungen Berlin, (1925)
- Lider-Tränensekretion, Trigeminus, Pupille, Akkomodation, Heterochromie, Sympathikus (with Hermann Wilbrand- 1851-1935). In: Handbuch der Neurologie des Auges, 1st supplementary volume, Munich 1927
