= Franz Joseph Julius Wilbrand =

German forensic physician (1811–1894)

Franz Joseph Julius Wilbrand (6 November 1811 in Giessen – 6 July 1894 in Giessen) was a German forensic physician. He was the father of chemist Julius Wilbrand (1839–1906) who discovered TNT and ophthalmologist Hermann Wilbrand (1851–1935).

He studied medicine at the University of Giessen where his teachers included his father, anatomist Johann Bernhard Wilbrand (1779–1846) and his uncle, obstetrician Ferdinand von Ritgen. After graduation (1833), he remained at Giessen as an assistant at the surgical hospital. In 1840 he became an associate professor, and three years later, attained a full professorship in forensic medicine and hygiene at the university.

He was among the first physicians to use creosote for treatment of scrofula, publishing the treatise Beiträge zur Würdigung der arzneilichen Wirkung des Kreosot's (1834) as a result. In 1840 he coined the term "horseshoe-shaped commissure of Wernekinck" as a name for the decussation of the brachium conjunctivum.

== Selected works ==
- Anatomie und Physiologie der Centralgebilde des Nervensystems, 1840 – Anatomy and physiology of the central structure of the nervous system.
- Leitfaden bei gerichtlichen Leichenuntersuchungen, 1841 – Guidelines for judicial autopsies.
- Lehrbuch der gerichtlichen Psychologie für Aerzte und Juristen, 1858 – Textbook of forensic psychology for doctors and lawyers.
