= William Hern =

American politician (1881–1954)

Member of the Nebraska Legislature from the 41st district
- In office January 2, 1945 – January 6, 1953
- Preceded by: Harry Gantz
- Succeeded by: J. Monroe Bixler

Personal details
- Born: 1881 Boone, Iowa
- Died: June 15, 1954 (aged 72) Chadron, Nebraska
- Party: Republican
- Spouse: Aldora B. Hutchinson (m. 1903)
- Occupation: Rancher, railroad conductor

William Hern (1881 – June 15, 1954) was a Republican politician from Nebraska who served as a member of the Nebraska Legislature from the 41st district from 1945 to 1953.

Hern was born in Boone, Iowa, in 1888, and moved to Nebraska in 1888. He was a railroad conductor on the Chicago and North Western Railway, and later retired to raise Hereford cattle. He served as a Republican on the Dawes County Commission from 1927 to 1939.

In 1944, when State Senator Harry Gantz declined to run for re-election, Hern was elected to succeed him in the 41st district. He was re-elected in 1946, 1948, and 1950. He was defeated for re-election in 1952 by J. Monroe Bixler.

Hern died on June 15, 1954.
