= Charcot–Wilbrand syndrome =

- Specialty: Neurology

Charcot–Wilbrand syndrome (CWS) is dream loss following focal brain damage specifically characterised by visual agnosia and loss of ability to mentally recall or "revisualize" images. The name of this condition dates back to the case study work of Jean-Martin Charcot and Hermann Wilbrand, and was first described by Otto Potzl as "mind blindness with disturbance of optic imagination". MacDonald Critchley, former president of the World Federation of Neurology, more recently summarized CWS as "a patient loses the power to conjure up visual images or memories, and furthermore, ceases to dream during his sleeping hours". This condition is quite rare and affects only a handful of brain damage patients. Further study could help illuminate the neurological pathway for dream formation.

== Symptoms and signs ==
=== Traditional classification ===
Combining early studies, the traditional symptoms of CWS centered on visual irreminiscence (aphantasia), prosopagnosia, and topographic agnosia. However, due to significant differences in the observations of Charcot and Wilbrand's case work, this syndrome bridged the entire loss of dreaming, whether it be due to the isolated inability of the brain to produce images while asleep as Charcot had dictated, or the complete loss of dreaming altogether as with Wilbrand. This has led to the terming of Charcot and Wilbrand variants, which corresponded to either the loss of dream imagery and visual irreminiscence or the complete ceasing of dream experience often coupled with agnosia.

=== Modern classification ===
There is new focus on the type of injury and analysis of REM sleep pertaining to CWS. A more current medical definition lists CWS as "the association of loss of the ability to conjure up visual images or memories and the loss of dreaming". A 2004 case study described a 73-year-old woman who had experienced an acute, bilateral occipital artery infarction which rendered her dreamless for more than three months was to perform polysomnography testing in combination with patient dream reporting to determine both her sleep architecture or pattern of sleep stages, and subsequent dream recollection. Such techniques allow for associations between the physiological timetable of dreaming during REM sleep and the patient's ability to recall dreams to be compared closely.

== Physiological causes ==
In patients with loss of visual imagery during sleep, instances of acute-onset brain damage such as thrombosis, hemorrhage, trauma, and carbon monoxide poisoning in particular have been indicated as possible motivators for CWS. Additionally, some slower progressing conditions, namely tumor growth (neoplasm) in brain tissue and abnormal embryonic development (dysgenesis) of the corpus callosum, have been associated with this syndrome. Patients with Alzheimer's disease as well as Turner syndrome have also described having CWS. In terms of localization, the lesion or damaged tissue is most often localized to the lateral (sides) or mesial (middle) occipitotemporal regions, and typically appears bilaterally (affecting both sides equally). The exact localization however has not been illuminated and can most accurately be summarized as "a lesion in an acute phase affecting the posterior regions".

Similarly, in patients with complete loss or suppression of dreaming there is typically an association with focal, acute-onset cerebral lesions like hemorrhage, thrombosis, or trauma. Early attempts to locate the lesion site responsible for the cessation of dreaming on a universal scale have led to the parietal lobe with no bias to either side, and single lesions of either hemisphere commonplace. Recent case studies of dream loss have found evidence suggesting that damage to the parietal is not necessary for CWS. Additionally, in some of the cases of parietal lobe lesions, the lesion continued into the occipitotemporal regions, further blurring the localization of global dream loss. In almost all cases, dreaming returned within 12 months, implying a possibility that the site of interest was only connected to the damaged regions, most likely through neural pathways, further complicating localization.

== Relation to REM sleep ==
REM sleep or rapid eye movement sleep is the sleep stage when traditionally the majority of dream activity has been documented. According to the activation-synthesis hypothesis the sensory systems (specifically the visual system activated by Ponto-Geniculo-Occipital waves or PGO waves named for the regions they travel through) as well as the vestibular system are activated during the REM stage. Feedback from the nerves controlling movement influence dream experience despite the inhibition of muscle control from the medulla which ceases motor activation through glutamatergic neurons in a process referred to as REM atonia. Mismatch of this data might create specific dream experiences such as floating or flying. Emotional behavior and memory formation centers, most importantly the amygdala and hippocampus. are reactivated during sleep and are believed to generate the emotional content of dreams. In patients with CWS, REM sleep is not necessarily impaired but the sensory systems activation is most likely impaired from the lesion damage resulting in decreased contribution to the synthesis of dreams. In particular damage to the occipitotemporal region may alter the activation normally produced by PGO waves leading to an absence of visual system activation. Additionally damage to the memory formation pathways might be responsible for the inability of patients to recall images.

== Detection methods ==
While scientific dream analysis has been avoided in the past given the difficulty in quantifying and qualifying the experience of patients, emerging technology has made it easier to chart brain activity and target physiological areas responsible for dream function.

=== Polysomnography ===
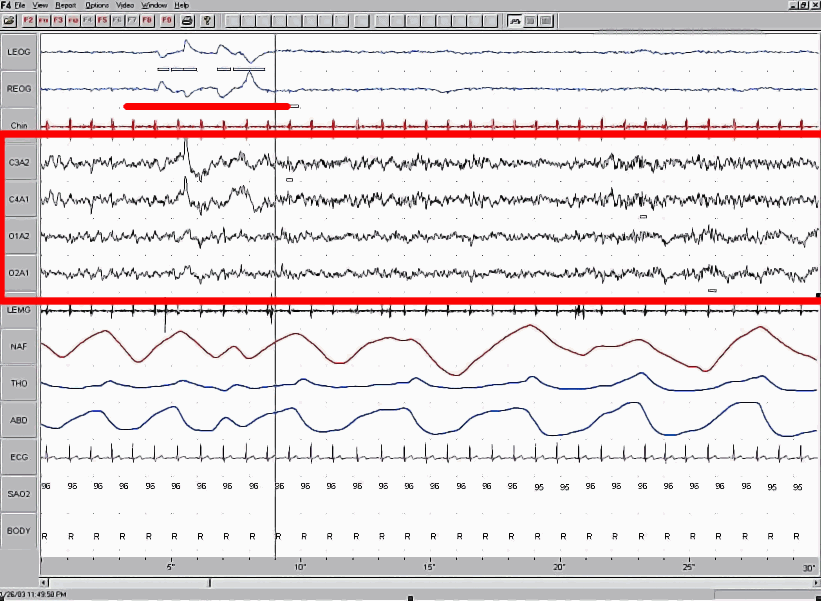
30 second Polysomnography report of REM sleep with EEG boxed in red and eye movements indicated by red line.

A polysomnography test (PSG) records the biological changes during sleep through monitoring the brain (Electroencephalography, EEG), eye movement (Electrooculography, EOG), heart rhythm (electrocardiogram, ECG), and muscle activity (Electromyography, EMG). Typically a complete PSG requires a minimum of 12 channels and 22 wire attachments and produces a "score" or report. Sleep stages are identifiable through comparison of the EEG, EOG and EMG channels with stages 1 and 2 being defined as light sleep, 3 being slow wave sleep and 4 being REM sleep. Additionally a PSG can reveal "arousals" or sudden shifts in brain wave activity. Analyzing the resulting amount of REM sleep in combination with patient reported dream experience has been the method of choice for recent dream studies. In particular researchers can wake the patient mid-REM sleep and ask for dream experience, which in normal patients would enhance their recollection and dream count. Absence of dream experience suggests the presence of CWS and this test method can also help to illustrate whether the patient has an inability to recall visual images or complete dream loss.

=== fMRI ===
Functional magnetic resonance imaging or functional MRI (fMRI) is the specific MRI procedure associated with measuring brain activity. It does so by detecting changes in blood flow (hemodynamic response) related to the energy utilization by the brain using a specific blood-oxygen-level-dependent contrast. Recently fMRI has come to the forefront of dream research because it does not require the use of dyes or isotopes and allows for brain blood flow and related activity to be monitored during sleep. Specifically analysis of dreaming patients have revealed increased blood flow/oxygen utilization by network consisting of the pontine tegmentum, thalamus, amygdala, basal ganglia, anterior cingulate and occipital cortex. Specifically in CWS activation of the occipital cortex is of great interest and it can be monitored through fMRI and combined with patient dream reporting to isolate dream formation. Additionally during sleep fMRI studies have revealed a significant decrease in the activity of the prefrontal cortex which likely accounts for the decrease in time perception, insight, and remembrance of dreams. This can be analyzed in patients to help better differentiate between global dream loss and a lack of visual remembrance. The specific mechanism for deactivation of the prefrontal cortex is unclear due to the complexity of the acetylcholine activation pathway and its expanse into variety of other cortical areas.

=== Dream journals ===
Dream journals are an effective tool for patients to quantify their dreaming experience. By recording the frequency of dreams and the level of detail, dream journals can be combined with other physiological data to arrive at the best picture of dream synthesis. Additionally dream journal data can help to organize the bizarre features within the dream experience such as discontinuities (incomprehensible shifts of time or location), incongruities (mismatching plot elements), and uncertainties (confusion over discrete concepts) which are useful to the dreamer.

== Medical significance ==
Until recently CWS was considered extremely rare and it is now recognized slightly more often as an acute phase of focal brain damage. While CWS patients do not experience any serious effects, dreaming is believed to provide some relatively important functions to the health of the human mind. It is hypothesized that a reverse learning mechanism occurs while dreaming that facilitate the unlearning of unfavorable pathways to the organism. Complete failure of such a system has been postulated to lead to a state of almost perpetual obsession coupled with hallucinatory associations. In addition it has been postulated that dreams account for emotional preservation, with the emotions one feels during nightmares and joyful dreams solidifying and checking the successful ability to express them. Lastly Freudian dream content analysis, although lacking in credibility in the modern scientific community, once held that dreams hold the key to understanding and emancipating the subconscious.

== Potential for research ==
=== Refining the dream pathway ===
Since CWS patients have limited to nonexistent symptoms other than dream loss, studying these cases can give great insight into the physiological basis of dreams. The regions of damage and condition affecting them can be compared to the severity of the dream-loss to help create a map of importance when it comes to synthesizing and remembering dream images.

=== Post-traumatic stress disorder ===
The diagnosis criteria for posttraumatic stress disorder (PTSD) involve hyper-arousal, disturbed sleeping, and traumatic nightmares with numerous REM-related sub-symptoms. CWS on the other hand marks little to no dreaming, decreased REM sleep to dream linkage, and lack of visual remembrance. The specific physiological changes that take place in CWS patients might help to isolate the dream formation pathways that are hyperactive in PTSD patients and offer clues on how to reduce them.

=== Depression ===
Major depression which is believed to be modified by acetylcholine systems, is a functional disorder pertaining to the same neuronal structures that regulate dreaming. CWS may unlock the means to understand the stimulation of these structures better leading to enhanced treatment for those with chronic depression.

== History ==
=== Jean-Martin Charcot ===
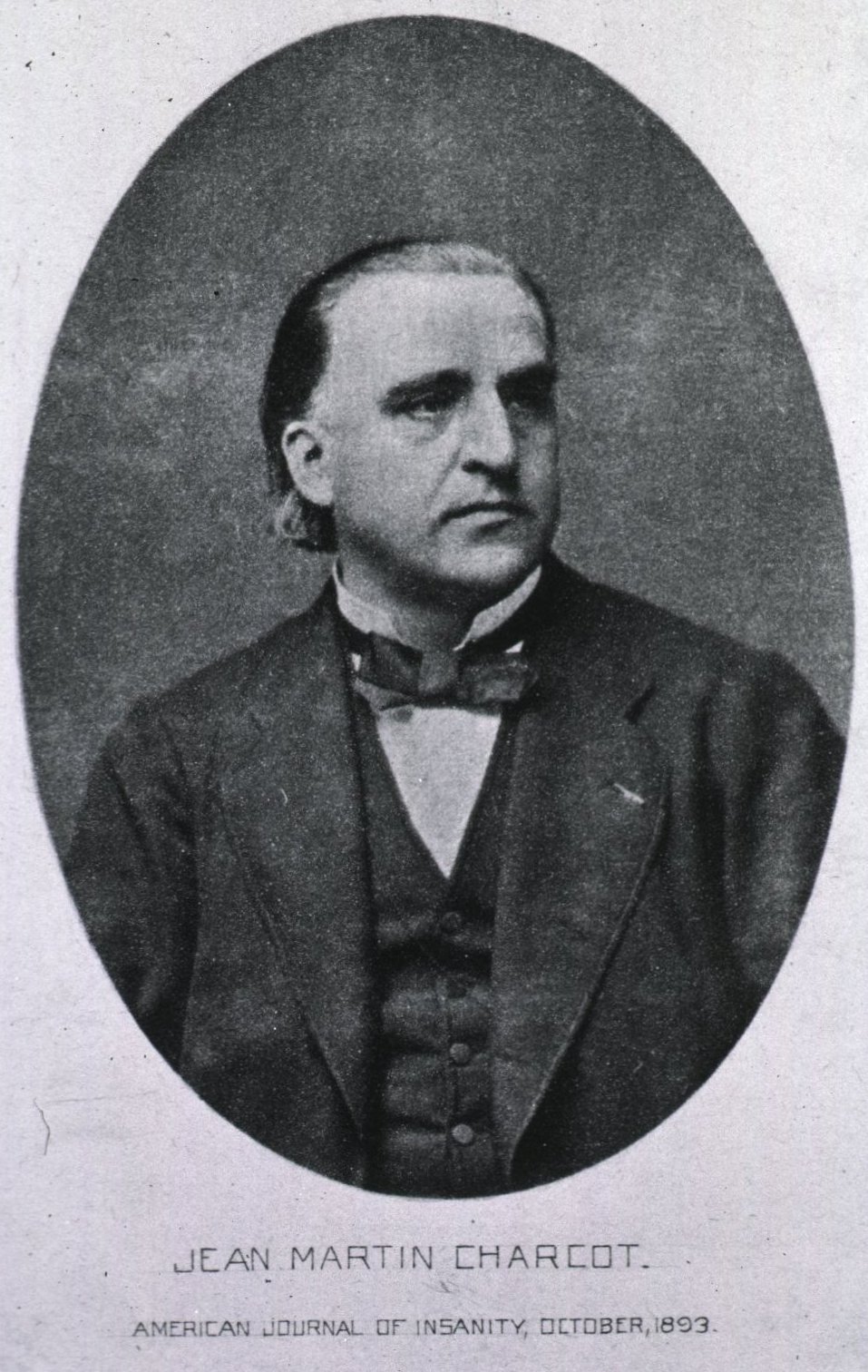
Portrait of Jean-Martin Charcot.

In 1883 Jean-Martin Charcot encountered a patient who most likely had posterior cerebral artery thrombosis (not confirmed with autopsy) and lost the ability to consciously reproduce images from his dreams while awake. While this patient still reported dreams of words, the inability to recall any imagery, termed visual irreminiscence, became the center of Charcot's case study. His resulting contribution to the formulation of the syndrome lies on the lack of ability to re-visualize dream imagery and does not imply their complete absence, but a general state of visual amnesia.

=== Hermann Wilbrand ===
In 1887 Hermann Wilbrand was studying an elderly female subject with bilateral posterior cerebral artery thrombosis. This subject displayed a complete inability to dream coupled with an inability to recognize familiar places, a condition known more recently as topographic agnosia. Additionally a condition known as prosopagnosia, or the inability to recognize familiar faces was also noted in the patient. Wilbrand's contribution revolves around the complete inability to produce dreams with the presence of agnosias as possible side conditions.

== See also ==
- Aphantasia
