= Wilbrandt =

Wilbrandt is a German surname. Notable people with the surname include:

- Adolf Wilbrandt (1837–1911), German novelist and dramatist
- Thomas Wilbrandt (born 1952), German composer and conductor

== See also ==
- Auguste Wilbrandt-Baudius (1843–1937), German-Austrian actress and journalist
- Wilbrand (disambiguation)
- Willebrand (disambiguation)
- Willebrandt
