= Ronald L. Coker =

Ronald Leroy Coker
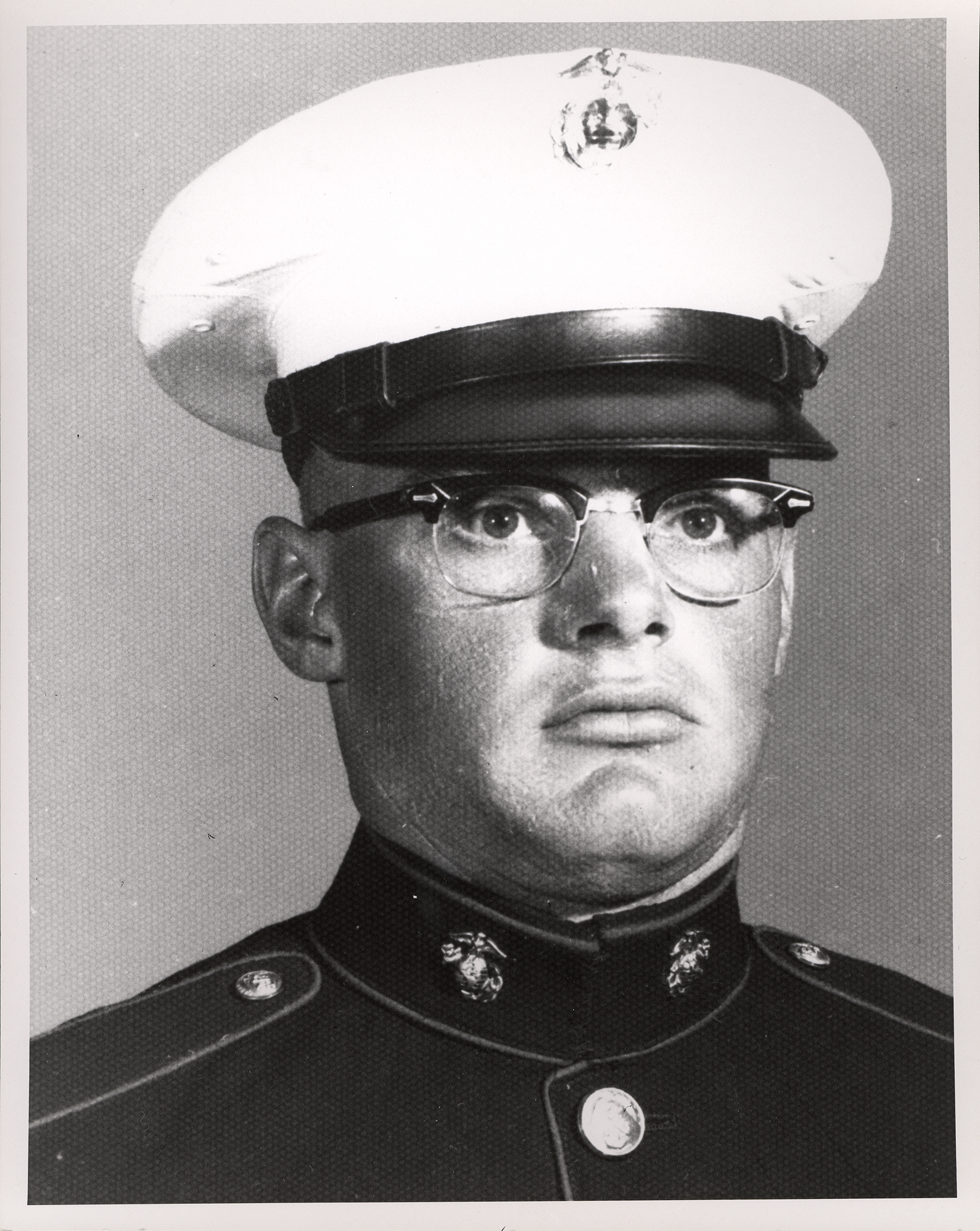
- Ronald L. Coker, Medal of Honor recipient
- Born: August 9, 1947; Alliance, Nebraska, U.S.
- Died: March 24, 1969 (aged 21); Quảng Trị province, Vietnam
- Burial place: Fairview Cemetery (Alliance, Nebraska)
- Military career
- Allegiance: United States of America
- Branch: United States Marine Corps
- Service years: 1968–1969
- Rank: Private First Class
- Units: Company M, 3rd Battalion 3rd Marines, 3rd Marine Division
- Conflicts: Vietnam War †
- Awards: Medal of Honor (1969); Purple Heart

Ronald Leroy Coker (August 9, 1947 – March 24, 1969) was a United States Marine who posthumously received the Medal of Honor for heroism in Vietnam in March 1969.

== Biography ==
Coker was born on August 9, 1947, in Alliance, Nebraska. He attended District 78 Rural Elementary School in Alliance, Alliance High School, and Denver Colorado Automotive School.

Drafted by the Selective Service Board in Alliance, Coker entered the United States Marine Corps at Denver, Colorado on April 16, 1968. He completed recruit training with the 1st Recruit Training Battalion, Recruit Training Regiment, Marine Corps Recruit Depot San Diego, California, in June 1968; individual combat training with Company Z, 3rd Battalion, 2nd Infantry Training Regiment, Camp Pendleton, California, in July 1968; and basic infantry training with Rifle Training Company, Basic Infantry Training Battalion, 2d Infantry Training Regiment at Camp Pendleton, in August. Coker was promoted to private first class on September 1, 1968.

Private First Class Coker then joined a replacement company, Staging Battalion, at Camp Pendleton, for transfer to the Republic of Vietnam.

Upon his arrival in Vietnam, in November 1968, Coker was assigned duty as a rifleman with Company M, 3rd Battalion 3rd Marines, 3rd Marine Division. While serving in this capacity, he was killed in action in the northwest section of Quang Tri Province, on March 24, 1969.

== Decorations ==
A complete list of his medals and decorations includes: the Medal of Honor, the Purple Heart, the National Defense Service Medal, the Vietnam Service Medal with one bronze star, and the Republic of Vietnam Campaign Medal.

Medal of Honor		Purple Heart
National Defense Service Medal	Vietnam Service Medal with one bronze star	Vietnam Campaign Medal

== Medal of Honor citation ==
The President of the United States in the name of The Congress takes pride in presenting the MEDAL OF HONOR posthumously to

PRIVATE FIRST CLASS RONALD L. COKER
UNITED STATES MARINE CORPS

for service as set forth in the following CITATION:

For conspicuous gallantry and intrepidity at the risk of his life above and beyond the call of duty while serving as a Rifleman with Company M, Third Battalion, Third Marines, Third Marine Division in action against enemy forces in the Republic of Vietnam. On March 24, 1969, while serving as Point Man for the Second Platoon, Private First Class Coker was leading his patrol when he encountered five enemy soldiers on a narrow jungle trail. Reacting instantly, he warned the Marines following him and wounded one of the enemy soldiers with his M16 rifle. When the enemy retreated, Private First Class Coker's squad aggressively pursued them to cave. As the squad neared the cave, it came under intense hostile fire, seriously wounding one Marine and forcing the others to take cover. Observing the wounded man lying exposed to continuous enemy fire, Private First Class Coker disregarded his own safety and moved across the fire-swept terrain toward his companion. Although wounded by enemy small arms fire, he ignored his injury as he resolutely continued to crawl across the hazardous area and then skillfully threw a hand grenade into the enemy positions, suppressing the hostile fire sufficiently to enable him to reach the wounded man. As he began to drag his injured comrade out of the enemy's killing zone, a hostile grenade landed on the wounded Marine. Unhesitatingly, Private First Class Coker grabbed the grenade with both hands and turned away from his wounded companion but, before he could dispose of the grenade it exploded. Severely wounded but undaunted he refused to abandon his comrade. As he moved toward friendly lines, two more enemy grenades exploded near him inflicting still further injuries. Possessed only with the safety of his comrade, Private First Class Coker, with supreme effort, continued to attempt to crawl and pull the wounded Marine with him. His heroic deeds inspired his fellow Marines to such aggressive action that the North Vietnamese fire was suppressed sufficiently to enable others to reach him and carrying him to a relatively safe area where he later succumbed to his extensive wounds. Private First Class Coker's indomitable courage, inspiring initiative and selfless devotion to duty upheld the highest traditions of the Marine Corps and the United States Naval Service. He gallantly gave his life for his country.

/S/ RICHARD M. NIXON

== See also ==
- List of Medal of Honor recipients
- List of Medal of Honor recipients for the Vietnam War
