= Hermann Wilbrand =

German ophthalmologist (1851–1935)

Hermann Wilbrand (22 May 1851 – 17 September 1935) was a German ophthalmologist born in Giessen.

Wilbrand was born in Giessen, Germany to Albertine Knapp and Franz Joseph Julius Wilbrand, a forensic physician. His older brother Julius Wilbrand was a chemist who discovered TNT and his grandfather was physician.

In 1875, he earned his doctorate at the University of Strassburg, and afterwards was an assistant to Ludwig Laqueur (1839-1909) at Strassburg and to Carl Friedrich Richard Förster (1825-1902) at Breslau. Later he moved to Hamburg, where he became head of the department of ophthalmology at Allgemeines Hospital in 1905.

Wilbrand specialized in the field of neuro-ophthalmology and carried out extensive research involving the pathology and physiology of the eye. He demonstrated that homonymous hemianopsia was caused by lesions in the occipital lobe and optic radiation as well as the optic tract.

== Associated eponyms ==
- Wilbrand's knee: A group of extramacular ganglion cell axons that extend forward into the posterior optic nerve.
- Charcot-Wilbrand syndrome: Syndrome involving visual agnosia and the inability to re-visualize images. Condition due to occlusion of the posterior cerebral artery of the dominant hemisphere. Named with French neurologist Jean-Martin Charcot (1825-1893).

== Written works ==
- Die hemianopischen Gesichtsfeldformen und das optische Wahrnehmungscentrum. Wiesbaden, 1890.
- Über Sehstörungen bei funktionellen Nervenleiden. with Alfred Saenger (1860-1921) Leipzig, 1892.
- Die Erhohlungsausdehnung des Gesichtsfeldes. Wiesbaden, (1896).
- Über die Augenerkrankungen in der Frühperiode der Syphilis. with Staelin. Hamburg and Leipzig, 1897.
- Die Neurologie des Auges: ein Handbuch für Nerven- und Augenärtze. (with Alfred Saenger; 9 volumes). Wiesbaden, 1900-1922.
- Die Theorie des Sehens. with Carl Behr (1876-1943) (supplementary volume, 1927), Wiesbaden, 1913.
- Der Faservelauf durch das Chiasma und die intrakraniellen Sehnerven. Berlin, 1929.
