= Tony Wilbrand =

American basketball player (born 1983)

Personal information
- Born: 1983 (age 42–43) Seattle, Washington, U.S.
- Listed height: 6 ft 10 in (2.08 m)
- Listed weight: 250 lb (113 kg)

Career information
- High school: Alliance (Alliance, Nebraska)
- College: Nebraska (2001–2006)
- NBA draft: 2006: undrafted
- Position: Center
- Number: 45

Career highlights
- First-team Academic All-Big 12 (2003-2005); Second-team Academic All-Big 12 (2002); Big 12 Commissioner's Honor Roll (9 times); Outstanding Attitude Award (2005-2006 season)

Tony Wilbrand (born 1983) is an American basketball player who last played as a center at the college level for the University of Nebraska–Lincoln.

== High school ==
Wilbrand grew up in Alliance, Nebraska. As a high school player, he led Alliance High School to its only Boy's State title as a senior in 2001.

In his Senior campaign he was selected to the Class B All-State Team and the Nebraska Super-State 1st Team.

Wilbrand holds the all-time state record for field goal percentage in a season in Class A and B, shooting 77.1% (108/140) from the floor.

Alliance High School retired his #45 jersey in 2007. Wilbrand is the only male basketball player to have his jersey retired at Alliance High School.

Wilbrand was inducted into the Alliance Activities Hall of Fame in 2017

== College career ==
At Nebraska, Wilbrand played five years (including a red-shirt year) under coach Barry Collier. A four-year contributor, the Cornhuskers went to two NIT Tournament berths during his career (2004, 2006).

== University of Nebraska statistics ==
Legend
GP	Games played	GS	Games started	MPG	Minutes per game
FG%	Field goal percentage	3P%	3-point field goal percentage	FT%	Free throw percentage
RPG	Rebounds per game	APG	Assists per game	SPG	Steals per game
BPG	Blocks per game	PPG	Points per game	**Bold**	Career high

Year	Team	GP	Points	FG%	3P%	FT%	RPG	APG	SPG	BPG	PPG
2002-03	Nebraska	21	10	36.2	0.0	33.3	.619	.095	.095	.048	.476
2003-04	Nebraska	**24**	**23**	**90.0**	0.0	62.5	**.875**	.208	.042	**.208**	**.958**
2004-05	Nebraska	17	12	46.2	0.0	0.0	.824	**.294**	**.118**	.294	.706
2005-06	Nebraska	19	10	36.4	0.0	**100.0**	.789	0.0	0.0	0.0	.526
Career	Nebraska	81	55	.523	0.0	.529	.778	.148	.062	.086	.679
