= Von Willebrand factor A domain containing 7 =

Protein-coding gene in the species Homo sapiens

VWA7

Identifiers
- Aliases: VWA7, C6orf27, G7c, NG37, von Willebrand factor A domain containing 7
- External IDs: OMIM: 609693; MGI: 1306798; HomoloGene: 11895; GeneCards: VWA7; OMA:VWA7 - orthologs

Gene location (Human)
Chr.	Chromosome 6 (human)
Band	6p21.33	Start	31,765,590 bp
Band	6p21.33	End	31,777,328 bp

Gene location (Mouse)
Chr.	Chromosome 17 (mouse)
Band	17 B1|17 18.55 cM	Start	35,235,555 bp
Band	17 B1|17 18.55 cM	End	35,245,717 bp
RNA expression pattern
Bgee	Human / Mouse (ortholog); Top expressed in: right uterine tube; pituitary gland; anterior pituitary; muscle of thigh; olfactory zone of nasal mucosa; islet of Langerhans; apex of heart; superior frontal gyrus; right frontal lobe; right hemisphere of cerebellum / Top expressed in: lumbar spinal ganglion; muscle of thigh; facial motor nucleus; transitional epithelium of urinary bladder; skeletal muscle tissue; epithelium of lens; cerebellar cortex; anterior horn of spinal cord; triceps surae; gastrocnemius muscle; More reference expression data
BioGPS	n/a
Gene ontology
Molecular function	molecular function
Cellular component	extracellular region; cellular component
Biological process	biological process
Sources:Amigo / QuickGO
Orthologs
Species	Human	Mouse
Entrez	80737	27762
Ensembl	ENSG00000230048; ENSG00000223757; ENSG00000227144; ENSG00000238203; ENSG00000234433 ENSG00000204396	ENSMUSG00000007030
UniProt	Q9Y334	Q9JHA8
RefSeq (mRNA)	NM_025258	NM_138582; NM_001347347
RefSeq (protein)	NP_079534	NP_001334276; NP_613048
Location (UCSC)	Chr 6: 31.77 – 31.78 Mb	Chr 17: 35.24 – 35.25 Mb
PubMed search
- Wikidata
View/Edit Human	View/Edit Mouse

Von Willebrand factor A domain containing 7 is a protein that in humans is encoded by the VWA7 gene. See articles on Von Willebrand factor and on Von Willebrand factor type A domain.
