= Von Willebrand factor type D domain =

Evolutionarily-conserved protein domain

VWD

Identifiers
- Symbol: VWD
- Pfam: PF00094
- InterPro: IPR001846
- PROSITE: PS51233
Available protein structures:
- Pfam: structures / ECOD
- PDB: RCSB PDB; PDBe; PDBj
- PDBsum: structure summary

Von Willebrand factor type D domain (vWD) is an evolutionarily-conserved protein domain found in, among others, the von Willebrand factor (vWF). vWF is a large multimeric glycoprotein and it is synthesized by a type of bone marrow cell called megakaryocytes. The vWD domain allows vWF to perform its blood-clotting function by carrying factor VIII around.

== Structure ==
The D8 domain (amino acids 6-102 in vWF) is a highly structured region containing 24 paired cysteine residues. Secondary structure prediction from 75 aligned vWF sequences has revealed a largely alternating sequence of alpha-helices and beta-strands in the larger vWF protein.

vWD is visible as lobes in cryo-EM images of the vWF. In a "D" domain of the vWF it is associated with a few other cysteine-rich domains named C8 (Pfam PF08742), TIL (Pfam PF01826) and vWE. A crystal structure for the "D" domains in vWF (D' and D3) was solved in 2018 (PDB: 6N29). The VWD domain proper and the vWE domain are composed mostly of antiparallel beta sheets. C8 folds into a few helices. TIL is mostly loops with a triad of beta sheets. VWD also contains a calcium binding site. All these domains are disulfide rich.

== Function ==
The vWD domain D'/D3 of the von Willebrand factor (vWF) serves as a carrier of clotting factor VIII (FVIII). The native conformation of the D' domain of vWF is not only required for factor VIII (FVIII) binding but also for normal multimerisation and optimal secretion. The interaction between blood clotting factor VIII and VWF is necessary for normal survival of blood clotting factor VIII in blood circulation. The VWFD domain is a highly structured region, in which the first conserved Cys has been found to form a disulphide bridge with the second conserved one. The other D domains in the protein are necessary for multimerisation.

This domain is found in mucins, in zonadhesin, in otogelin, and in vitellogenin. Many of these proteins are extracellular glycoproteins. It is also found in a Cypridina-luciferin 2-monooxygenase P17554. Its actual functions in these proteins are unknown.
