= Ernst Gustaf von Willebrand =

Swedish-Finnish governor, general and industrialist (1751–1809)

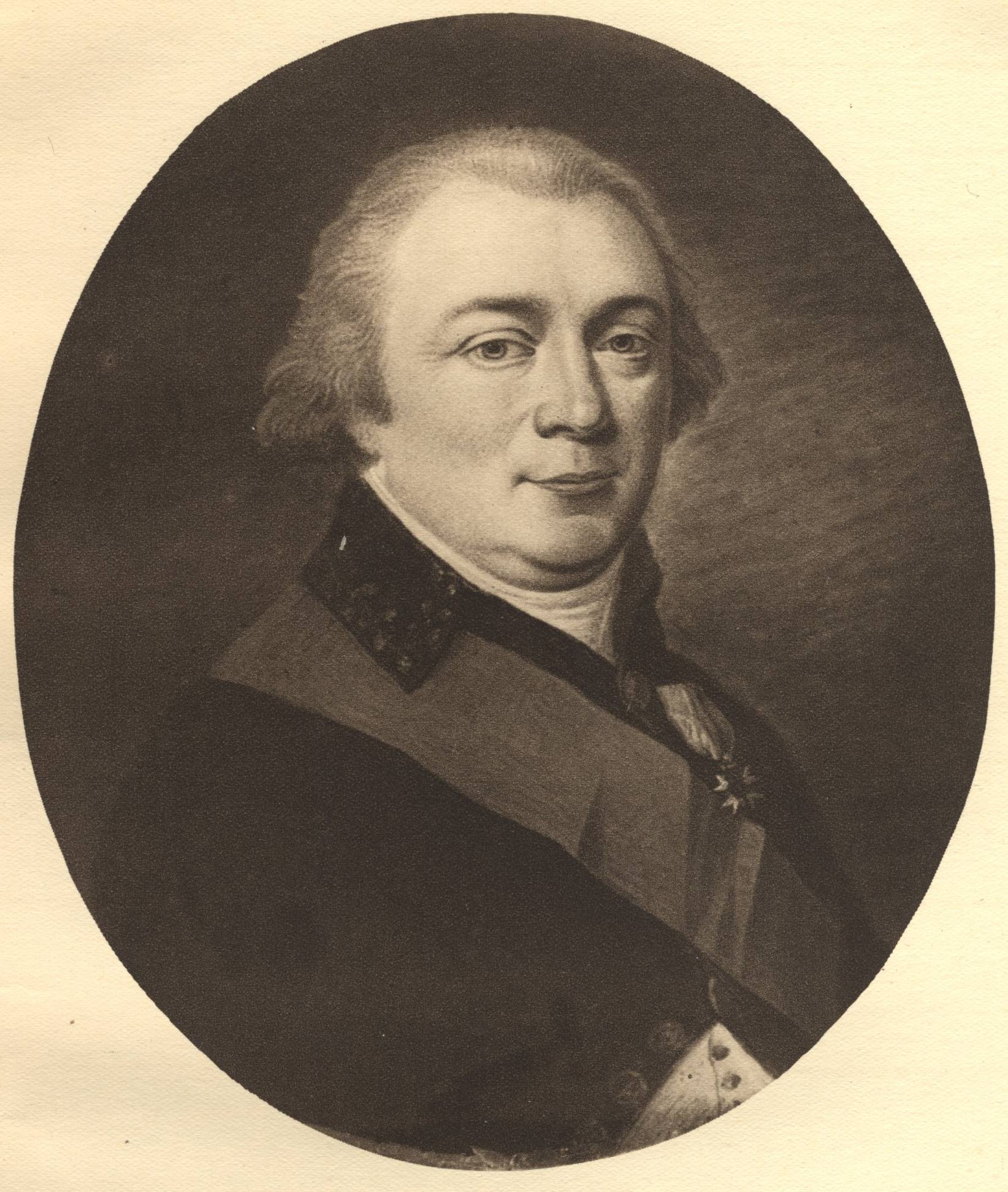
- Von Willebrand c. 1810
- Born: 19 August 1751; Karuna manor, Swedish Finland
- Died: 25 June 1809 (aged 57); Åbo, Swedish Finland
- Spouse: Vendla Gustava von Wright (m. 1778)
- Children: 3

Ernst Gustaf von Willebrand (19 August 1751 – 25 June 1809) was a Swedish-Finnish governor, major general and industrialist. He is regarded as one of the most prominent officials and industrialists in Swedish Finland at the end of Swedish rule. As governor of Turku and Pori County from 1790, he was known for his initiative, and at Jockis manor he developed one of Finland's largest industrial centres, encompassing a cloth factory, ironworks and sawmills.

== Biography ==
Ernst Gustaf von Willebrand was born into a noble military family and enrolled as a volunteer in the Turku Regiment as early as 1764. His career advanced rapidly, and in February 1778 he married Vendla Gustava von Wright, daughter of Georg Henrik von Wright, lieutenant colonel of the Nyland Infantry Regiment.

=== Military career ===
Three months after his marriage, von Willebrand was appointed lieutenant in the Nyland Infantry Regiment; in 1781 he became captain, in 1783 major, and in 1787 lieutenant colonel. He resigned from active military service in 1785 and moved into a civilian career.

=== Civil career ===
In 1787 he was appointed acting governor of Uusimaa and Häme County. The following year he took up a post at the War Commissariat, where he remained throughout Gustav III's war against Russia (1788–1790). In this position he managed, alongside his official duties, to accumulate considerable personal wealth.

In 1790, having gained the favour of King Gustav III, von Willebrand was appointed governor of Turku and Pori County in southwestern Finland. That same year he was also appointed secretary of state for army affairs. Two years later he resigned from the secretaryship and was, in keeping with the custom of the time, promoted to major general. He then moved to Finland to take up his governorship. He subsequently became chairman of the kingdom's waterway clearance board, a role he administered from Finland.

As governor he was well regarded, despite having in 1793 negotiated over his office and demanded a high price for it – as was common practice at the time. The citizens of Åbo (present-day Turku) valued his initiative. He paid particular attention to fire safety in the city, and among other things demanded that a fire watchtower be built on the summit of Vårdberget.

=== Jockis manor and industry ===
Von Willebrand had become acquainted with the Tammela parish in southwestern Tavastia, his wife's home district, and had himself lived there by the mid-1770s at the latest. He had managed his uncle's manor of Jockis, and likely performed cavalry service on the manor's behalf. In the early 1780s he purchased Viksberg farm in Hautakorva, Tammela, and in 1791 the large Jockis manor itself. The estate became so extensive – running to thousands of hectares – that people colloquially began speaking of the "Jockis county".

Once settled in Finland, von Willebrand set about renovating Jockis. Within two decades the formerly modest country estate became one of Finland's most stately manors and one of the country's largest industrial centres. Von Willebrand renewed the entire building stock of the estate. Construction of the main building, designed by C.C. Gjörwell, began in 1794. When completed, the palace-like brick structure measured 45 metres in length and contained 30 rooms. It is regarded as Finland's first manor house in the neoclassical style and served as a model for several other manors.

After completing the main building, von Willebrand had an even larger brick cattle barn erected and a new stone granary built. A three-storey timber grain storehouse with an impressive clock tower dates from around 1808. In addition to the new buildings, he laid out an extensive garden and a large English-style park. Greenhouses were already a rarity in Finland, and von Willebrand further distinguished himself by modelling his orangery on that at Versailles.

Von Willebrand was also active in the sawmill industry. As early as the beginning of the seventeenth century there had been a single-blade water-powered sawmill on the Jockis estate. During the first half of the eighteenth century, modern Dutch water-powered sawmills with around ten blades had begun to appear along the Finnish south coast, and the multi-blade sawmill built at Jockis in the early 1750s was among the first of its kind in Tavastia. Von Willebrand expanded and improved the estate's sawmill operations in the 1790s. He was also a part-owner of several other sawmills in southwestern Tavastia, and in Finland Proper he owned the Koski sawmill.

Von Willebrand was also active in the textile industry. In 1796 he founded a cloth factory at Jockis – despite the economic policy of the time prohibiting manufactures in rural areas. He built the factory first and applied for permission afterwards; thanks to his connections he obtained a licence in 1797, by which time production was already in full swing. The factory soon grew into Finland's largest and most modern of its kind. Through his contacts he secured large orders from the army, and the manufactory sourced raw materials partly from the estate's large sheep farm. In 1800 new English carding and spinning machines powered by water were acquired, marking a significant step towards industrial production in Finnish textile manufacturing. Von Willebrand obtained civic rights in Åbo and opened a shop in the city, and the Jockis cloth factory enjoyed great success under his direction.

In 1804 von Willebrand had an ironworks built at the Jockis rapids. Pig iron was imported from central Sweden and refined into wrought iron on site, while charcoal was sourced from the estate's own forests.

Under von Willebrand's direction Jockis became the industrial centre of Tavastia, as in addition to the sawmills and the iron and cloth factories, a large brickworks and a distillery were also established on the estate. Most of the brickworks' output went to the estate's own building projects, while a large share of the spirits was transported to Åbo. At the estate's rapids stood a large watermill where, in addition to ordinary grain, wheat and fine rye flour were milled for the use of the upper classes.

Outside Jockis, von Willebrand was a part-owner of the Åbo New Tobacco Factory, founded at the time of his move to Finland. The factory was originally located in Nådendal but moved to Åbo in 1795. In competition with two older tobacco factories it never managed to grow significantly, particularly as the supply of foreign raw materials began to run short as a result of the Napoleonic Wars in the early nineteenth century.

In the Gustavian Finland of the late eighteenth century, von Willebrand was among the most ardent advocates of agricultural reform. He was the first chairman of the Finnish Husbandry Society (Finska hushållningssällskapet), founded in 1797. When no other member of the society was willing to try building clay houses in Finland, he had several such structures erected at Jockis.

=== Cultural life ===
Von Willebrand was an active patron of culture. As chairman of the Musical Society in Åbo, he and his daughters participated in concerts and theatrical life. The poet Michael Choraeus, who served as tutor to von Willebrand's family, praised his employer's cultural interests warmly. Both the governor's official residence in Åbo and Jockis manor became centres of Finnish cultural life. During winters in Åbo, von Willebrand hosted weekly Friday gatherings with dancing and dinner, in rotation with other leading figures in the city's cultural life. In summer, Jockis received visitors every week. On an island at the estate's rapids he had "the Fisherman's Cottage" built, where family and guests could enjoy nature – and where his daughters found advantageous matches.

=== Contemporary assessments ===
Contemporary opinions of von Willebrand were divided. Some, such as Choraeus, praised him warmly, while others, including the scholar Henrik Gabriel Porthan, were critical. His rapid rise and accumulated wealth provoked envy, and he was regarded by some as self-interested and not above resorting to cunning intrigue. Towards those in his service he was strict, yet he nonetheless commanded their respect and esteem.

=== Final years ===
In the early 1800s von Willebrand had drawn up extensive plans for organising the kingdom's defence. After Russian forces conquered southern Finland in 1808, however, the old general did not long support Sweden's efforts to retain Finland. He offered his services to the Russians and, as war commissary in Russian service, managed the provisioning and transport of the occupying army in Turku and Pori County and in Uusimaa and Häme County.

Von Willebrand began in the summer of 1808 to plan a deputation to petition the Russian emperor in Saint Petersburg. His son-in-law Carl Erik Mannerheim was chosen as chairman of the deputation at a meeting at Jockis in September 1808, while von Willebrand himself had to be content with membership, despite the fact that the Russian commander-in-chief General von Buxhoevden would have preferred to see him as chairman. The energetic von Willebrand did not accept his situation passively, and visited Saint Petersburg in advance of the main deputation in his capacity as chairman of the waterway clearance board, but this visit proved of little consequence.

Von Willebrand represented his family at the Diet of Porvoo in 1809 – the assembly convened by Tsar Alexander I at which Finland's transition to a Russian grand duchy was formalised. Although he was elected to the civil and economic committee, he was forced to watch others manage the grand duchy's affairs. Shortly afterwards von Willebrand fell ill and died in Åbo at midsummer 1809. He was buried in the park at Jockis manor, where a memorial to him and his wife was erected in 1833. The manor was later taken over by the state, and the main building and surrounding grounds eventually became part of the Agricultural Research Centre of Finland.
