= ADAMTS13 endopeptidase =

Class of enzymes

Identifiers
- EC no.: 3.4.24.87

Databases
- IntEnz: IntEnz view
- BRENDA: BRENDA entry
- ExPASy: NiceZyme view
- KEGG: KEGG entry
- MetaCyc: metabolic pathway
- PRIAM: profile
- PDB structures: RCSB PDB PDBe PDBsum
Search
- PMC: articles
- PubMed: articles
- NCBI: proteins

ADAMTS13 endopeptidase (EC 3.4.24.87, ADAMTS VWF cleaving metalloprotease, ADAMTS-13, ADAMTS13, vWF-cleaving protease, VWF-CP, vWF-degrading protease, Upshaw factor, von Willebrand factor cleaving protease, ADAMTS13 peptidase) is an enzyme. This enzyme catalyses the following chemical reaction

The enzyme cleaves the von Willebrand factor at bond Tyr^{842}-Met^{843} within the A2 domain

This enzyme belong in the peptidase family M12.
