= Wilbrandia =

Scientific classification
- Kingdom: Plantae
- Clade: Tracheophytes
- Clade: Angiosperms
- Clade: Eudicots
- Clade: Rosids
- Order: Cucurbitales
- Family: Cucurbitaceae
- Subfamily: Cucurbitoideae
- Tribe: Coniandreae
- Genus: Wilbrandia; Silva Manso

Genus of flowering plants

Wilbrandia is a genus of flowering plants belonging to the family Cucurbitaceae. It is also in Tribe Coniandreae.

It is native to Brazil, Paraguay and north-eastern Argentina.

== Known species ==
As accepted by Plants of the World Online:

- Wilbrandia ebracteata Cogn.
- Wilbrandia glaziovii Cogn.
- Wilbrandia hibiscoides Silva Manso
- Wilbrandia longisepala Cogn.
- Wilbrandia verticillata (Vell.) Cogn.

The genus name of Wilbrandia is in honour of Johann Bernhard Wilbrand (1779–1846), a German anatomist and naturalist. He was a proponent of Naturphilosophie. It was first described and published in Enum. Subst. Braz. page 30 in 1836.
