= Julius Wilbrand =

German chemist (1839–1906)

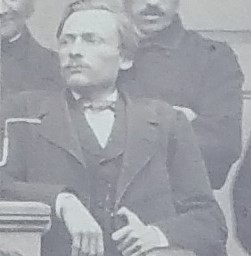
- Wilbrand in June 1863
- Born: Julius Bernhard Friedrich Adolph Wilbrand; 22 August 1839; Giessen, Germany
- Died: 22 June 1906 (aged 66)
- Occupation: Chemist
- Known for: TNT
- Father: Franz Joseph Julius Wilbrand
- Relatives: Hermann Wilbrand (brother)

Julius Bernhard Friedrich Adolph Wilbrand (22 August 1839 – 22 June 1906) was a German chemist who discovered trinitrotoluene, more commonly known as TNT.

He was born on 22 August 1839 in Giessen, Germany, to Albertine Knapp and Franz Joseph Julius Wilbrand, a forensic physician. His brother, Hermann Wilbrand, was an ophthalmologist.

In 1863, Wilbrand discovered TNT while experimenting with new solutions for yellow dye. He obtained trinitrotoluene through the nitration of toluene. TNT was originally used as a yellow dye; its potential as an explosive was not recognized until 1891, when its explosive properties were discovered by another German chemist, Carl Häussermann.

Wilbrand died on 22 June 1906.
