= Johann Bernhard Wilbrand =

German anatomist and naturalist (1779–1846)

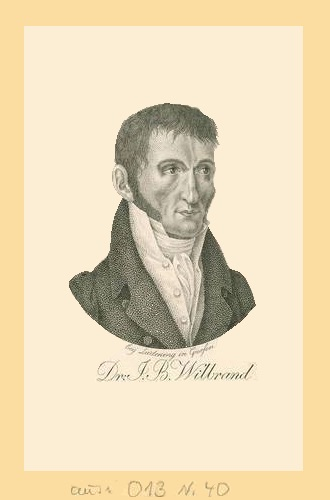
Wilbrand in 1806

Johann Bernhard Wilbrand (8 March 1779 in Clarholz – 6 May 1846 in Giessen) was a German anatomist and naturalist. He was a proponent of Naturphilosophie.

In 1806 he received his medical doctorate from the University of Würzburg, then continued his education in Paris, where he attended lectures given by Georges Cuvier, André Marie Constant Duméril and Jean-Baptiste Lamarck. Afterwards, he served as a lecturer at the University of Münster, and in 1808 relocated to the University of Giessen as a professor of anatomy and physiology.

At the University of Giessen, he served as director of the botanical garden (from 1817) and zoological cabinets (from 1836). In 1835 he received the title of Geheimer Medizinal-Rat. The plant genus Wilbrandia from South America, in the (family Cucurbitaceae) was named in his honor by Antônio Luiz Patrício da Silva Manso.

== Selected works ==
- ''Handbuch der Botanik nach Linné's System : enthaltend die in Deutschland und in den angränzenden Gegenden wildwachsenden, und merkwürdige ausländische Gewächse, 1819 – Handbook of botany according to the Linnaean System.
- Das Hautsystem in allen seinen Verzweigungen, anatomisch, physiologisch und pathologisch, 1820 – The skin in all of its ramifications; anatomy, physiology and pathology.
- Uebersicht der Vegetation Deutschlands nach ihren natürlichen Familien, 1824 – Overview of German plants according to their natural families.
- Handbuch der vergleichenden Anatomie in ihrer nächsten Beziehung auf die Physiologie für wissenschaftliche Aertze und für studirende der Arzneikunde, 1838 – Handbook of comparative anatomy and its relationship to physiology.
- Ueber den zusammenhang der natur mit dem übersinnlichen, 1843 – From the context of the natural with the supernatural.
