= Alliance, Nebraska =

- City
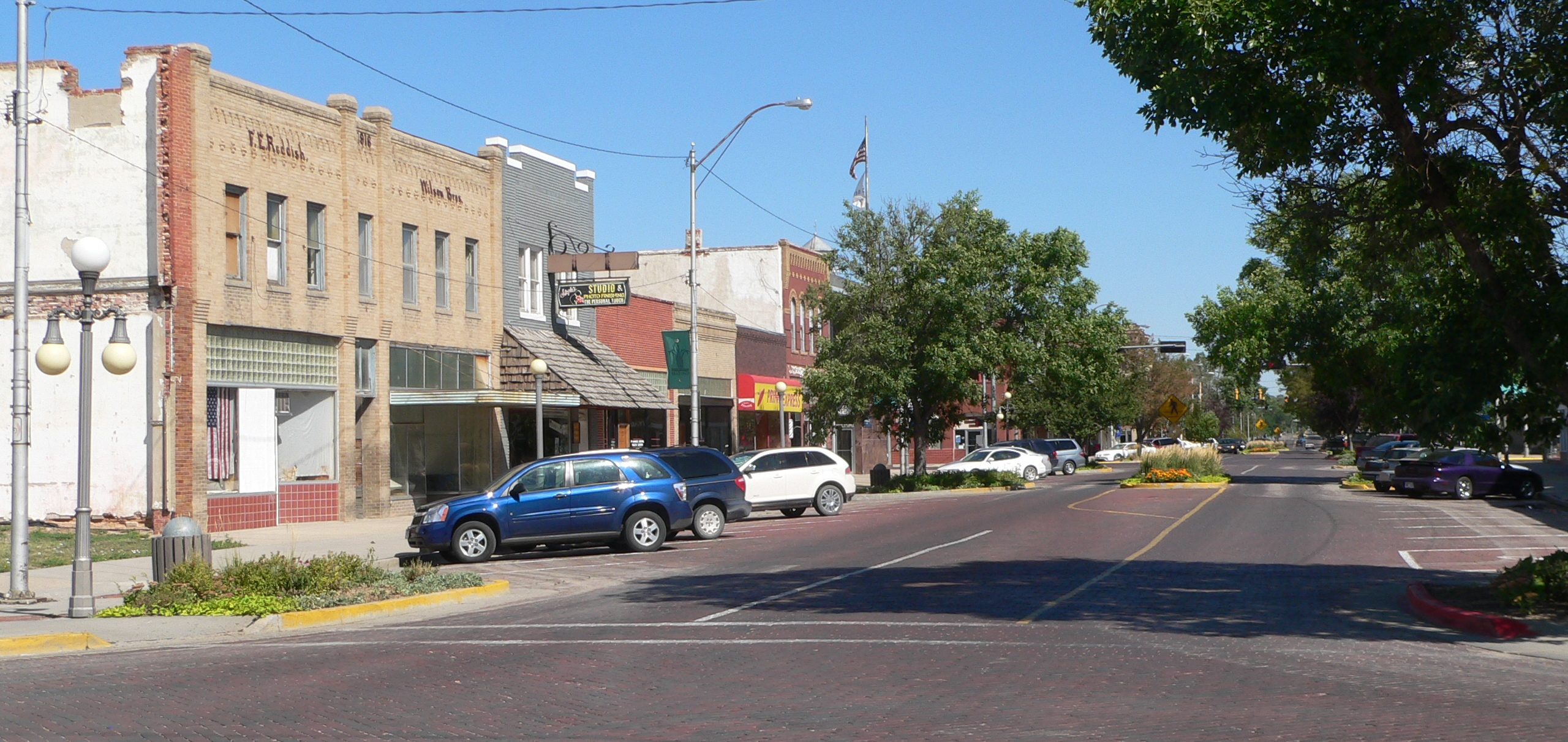
- Downtown Alliance: Box Butte Avenue

- Logo

- Location of Alliance within Nebraska and Box Butte County

- Location within the United States Alliance (Nebraska)
- Coordinates: 42°06′11″N 102°52′36″W
- Country: United States
- State: Nebraska
- County: Box Butte

Area
  - Total: 4.91 sq mi (12.71 km^{2})
  - Land: 4.90 sq mi (12.68 km^{2})
  - Water: 0.012 sq mi (0.03 km^{2})
- Elevation: 3,970 ft (1,210 m)

Population (2020)
  - Total: 8,151
  - Density: 1,665.5/sq mi (643.05/km^{2})
- Time zone: UTC−7 (Mountain (MST))
  - Summer (DST): UTC−6 (MDT)
- ZIP code: 69301
- Area code: 308
- FIPS code: 31-00905
- GNIS feature ID: 2393923
- Website: cityofalliance.net

Alliance is a city in and the county seat of Box Butte County, in the western part of the state of Nebraska, in the Great Plains region of the United States. Its population was 8,151 at the 2020 census.

Alliance is home to Carhenge, a replica of Stonehenge constructed with automobiles, which is located north of the city. It is also the location of Alliance Municipal Airport, which in 2021 was the least-used airport in the mainland United States.

== History ==
The town was originally named Grand Lake. When the Chicago, Burlington and Quincy Railroad came to Grand Lake in 1888, the railroad superintendent, G.W. Holdrege, wanted to change it to a simple one-word name closer to the beginning of the alphabet, which he thought would be better for business. The U.S. Post Office gave Holdrege permission, and he picked "Alliance" for the new name of the town. Alliance was incorporated as a city in 1891.

The Alliance Army Airfield was established in 1942. Construction was completed in August 1943 and the Army Air Corps used the facility as a training base until the end of World War II. The facility was transferred from the federal government to the City of Alliance in 1953 and is currently in use as the Alliance Municipal Airport.

In the Lakota language, Alliance is known as čhasmú okáȟmi, meaning "Sand River Bend".

== Geography ==
Alliance is located at the western edge of Nebraska's Sand Hills. According to the United States Census Bureau, the city has a total area of 4.73 square miles (12.25 km^{2}), of which 4.72 square miles (12.22 km^{2}) is land and 0.01 square miles (0.03 km^{2}) is water.

=== Climate ===
Located in the High Plains, Alliance's climate is rather typical of the surrounding region. Under the Köppen climate classification, the town features a BSk climate, commonly described as a "cool semi-arid climate", with winters just below the −3 °C (26.6 °F) threshold needed to be classified as a continental climate, if it had enough precipitation to not be semi-arid.

The all-time record high for Alliance is 110 °F (43.3 °C), set on July 19, 1983, and the all-time record low is −42 °F (−41.1 °C), set on December 22, 1989. Precipitation is significantly higher in summer than in winter, with the wettest month being June, and the driest January.

Climate data for Alliance Municipal Airport, Nebraska
Month	Jan	Feb	Mar	Apr	May	Jun	Jul	Aug	Sep	Oct	Nov	Dec	Year
Record high °F (°C)	70 (21)	77 (25)	84 (29)	91 (33)	101 (38)	105 (41)	110 (43)	105 (41)	102 (39)	91 (33)	80 (27)	72 (22)	110 (43)
Mean daily maximum °F (°C)	38.2 (3.4)	40.5 (4.7)	51.2 (10.7)	58.8 (14.9)	68.5 (20.3)	80.7 (27.1)	88.5 (31.4)	86.6 (30.3)	77.4 (25.2)	62.0 (16.7)	49.2 (9.6)	38.4 (3.6)	61.7 (16.5)
Daily mean °F (°C)	24.1 (−4.4)	26.3 (−3.2)	36.4 (2.4)	43.6 (6.4)	53.6 (12.0)	65.0 (18.3)	72.2 (22.3)	70.1 (21.2)	60.1 (15.6)	45.5 (7.5)	33.4 (0.8)	23.7 (−4.6)	46.2 (7.9)
Mean daily minimum °F (°C)	10.0 (−12.2)	12.2 (−11.0)	21.6 (−5.8)	28.3 (−2.1)	38.7 (3.7)	49.3 (9.6)	55.9 (13.3)	53.6 (12.0)	42.8 (6.0)	29.0 (−1.7)	17.6 (−8.0)	8.9 (−12.8)	30.7 (−0.8)
Record low °F (°C)	−31 (−35)	−40 (−40)	−25 (−32)	−12 (−24)	7 (−14)	27 (−3)	33 (1)	30 (−1)	15 (−9)	−8 (−22)	−25 (−32)	−42 (−41)	−42 (−41)
Average precipitation inches (mm)	0.20 (5.1)	0.28 (7.1)	0.60 (15)	1.72 (44)	2.65 (67)	2.90 (74)	2.40 (61)	1.49 (38)	1.26 (32)	0.91 (23)	0.24 (6.1)	0.23 (5.8)	14.88 (378.1)
Average precipitation days (≥ 0.01 in)	2.8	4.2	4.8	8.4	11.6	10.9	8.5	7.7	6.9	6.4	3.4	3.2	78.8
Mean monthly sunshine hours	179	190	230	246	277	308	340	306	266	237	179	163	2,921
Source 1: NOAA (precipitation, mean temperatures)
Source 2: The Weather Channel Chiniki

== Demographics ==
Historical population
Census	Pop.	Note	%±
1890	829		—
1900	2,535		205.8%
1910	3,105		22.5%
1920	4,591		47.9%
1930	6,669		45.3%
1940	6,253		−6.2%
1950	7,891		26.2%
1960	7,845		−0.6%
1970	6,862		−12.5%
1980	9,920		44.6%
1990	9,765		−1.6%
2000	8,959		−8.3%
2010	8,491		−5.2%
2020	8,151		−4.0%
U.S. Decennial Census; 2012 Estimate

=== 2020 census ===
As of the 2020 census, Alliance had a population of 8,151. The median age was 39.2 years. 24.6% of residents were under the age of 18 and 19.0% of residents were 65 years of age or older. For every 100 females there were 98.6 males, and for every 100 females age 18 and over there were 96.5 males age 18 and over.

99.4% of residents lived in urban areas, while 0.6% lived in rural areas.

There were 3,455 households in Alliance, of which 28.9% had children under the age of 18 living in them. Of all households, 45.7% were married-couple households, 22.2% were households with a male householder and no spouse or partner present, and 25.8% were households with a female householder and no spouse or partner present. About 34.1% of all households were made up of individuals and 13.8% had someone living alone who was 65 years of age or older. The average household size was 2.3 and the average family size was 2.9.

There were 3,967 housing units, of which 12.9% were vacant. The homeowner vacancy rate was 2.3% and the rental vacancy rate was 18.5%.

Racial composition as of the 2020 census
Race	Number	Percent
White	6,582	80.8%
Black or African American	62	0.8%
American Indian and Alaska Native	340	4.2%
Asian	67	0.8%
Native Hawaiian and Other Pacific Islander	5	0.1%
Some other race	385	4.7%
Two or more races	710	8.7%
Hispanic or Latino (of any race)	1,150	14.1%

=== Income and poverty ===
The 2016–2020 5-year American Community Survey estimates show that the median household income was $57,898 (with a margin of error of +/- $14,867) and the median family income $83,969 (+/- $16,048). Males had a median income of $42,001 (+/- $8,679) versus $26,975 (+/- $5,462) for females. The median income for those above 16 years old was $34,457 (+/- $4,215). Approximately, 9.6% of families and 13.3% of the population were below the poverty line, including 9.4% of those under the age of 18 and 13.1% of those ages 65 or over.

=== 2010 census ===
As of the census of 2010, there were 8,491 people, 3,559 households, and 2,276 families living in the city. The population density was 1,798.9 inhabitants per square mile (694.6/km^{2}). There were 4,075 housing units at an average density of 863.3 per square mile (333.3/km^{2}). The racial makeup of the city was 87.5% White, 0.5% African American, 4.6% Native American, 0.3% Asian, 4.2% from other races, and 2.9% from two or more races. Hispanic or Latino of any race were 12.3% of the population.

There were 3,559 households, of which 31.0% had children under the age of 18 living with them, 50.3% were married couples living together, 9.8% had a female householder with no husband present, 3.8% had a male householder with no wife present, and 36.0% were non-families. 32.4% of all households were made up of individuals, and 12.8% had someone living alone who was 65 years of age or older. The average household size was 2.34 and the average family size was 2.96.

The median age in the city was 39.8 years. 25.8% of residents were under the age of 18; 6.9% were between the ages of 18 and 24; 23.2% were from 25 to 44; 29.2% were from 45 to 64; and 14.9% were 65 years of age or older. The gender makeup of the city was 48.4% male and 51.6% female.

=== 2000 census ===
As of the census of 2000, there were 8,959 people, 3,565 households, and 2,392 families living in the city. The population density was 1,879.1 inhabitants per square mile (725.5/km^{2}). There were 4,062 housing units at an average density of 852.0 per square mile (329.0/km^{2}). The racial makeup of the city was 89.09% White, 0.49% African American, 3.40% Native American, 0.60% Asian, 0.01% Pacific Islander, 4.31% from other races, and 2.09% from two or more races. Hispanic or Latino of any race were 8.94% of the population.

There were 3,565 households, out of which 36.0% had children under the age of 18 living with them, 54.8% were married couples living together, 9.4% had a female householder with no husband present, and 32.9% were non-families. 29.5% of all households were made up of individuals, and 11.7% had someone living alone who was 65 years of age or older. The average household size was 2.46 and the average family size was 3.06.

In the city, the population was spread out, with 28.1% under the age of 18, 8.0% from 18 to 24, 27.1% from 25 to 44, 22.4% from 45 to 64, and 14.4% who were 65 years of age or older. The median age was 37 years. For every 100 females, there were 96.2 males. For every 100 females age 18 and over, there were 91.8 males.

As of 2000 the median income for a household in the city was $39,408, and the median income for a family was $47,766. Males had a median income of $39,122 versus $22,561 for females. The per capita income for the city was $18,584. About 10.6% of families and 11.2% of the population were below the poverty line, including 15.1% of those under age 18 and 9.9% of those age 65 or over.

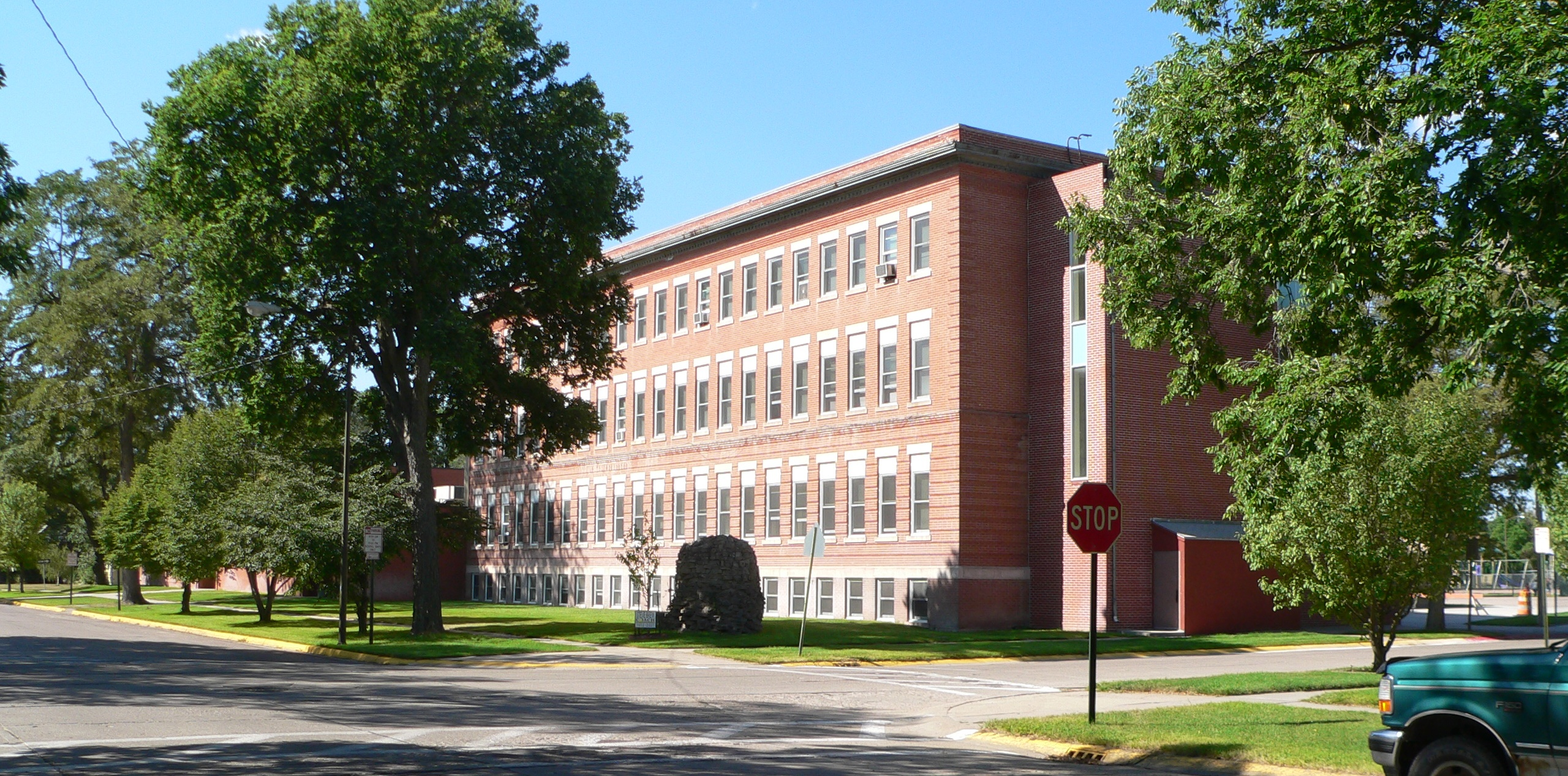
Historic St. Agnes Academy is the local Catholic school.

== Arts and culture ==
Among the city's attractions is Carhenge, an assemblage of thirty-eight vehicles built in the model of Stonehenge by Jim Reinders and thirty-five family members in the summer of 1987. The sculpture was constructed on the farm of Reinders's late father just north of Alliance. Other works have been built in the surrounding area of the sculpture.

== Education ==
Alliance Public Schools operates five schools: Early Childhood Center (birth to age 5), Emerson Elementary (kindergarten through grade 2), Grandview Elementary (grades 3–5), Alliance Middle School (grades 6–8), and Alliance High School (grades 9–12).

St. Agnes Academy is the local parochial school, in association with Holy Rosary and St. Bridget Catholic Churches. St. Agnes is located within a historic building designed by noted architect William L. Steele.

== Infrastructure ==
=== Transportation ===
==== Airport ====
Alliance is served by the Alliance Municipal Airport, three miles southeast of the city, which it owns. In the 12 months ending in January 2021, the airport received 2,882 passengers, or an average of just 8 per day, making it the least-used airport in the mainland United States.

==== Railway ====
The BNSF railway line from the northern exit of the Powder River Basin, one of the largest coal-mining areas of the world, to Alliance and the eastern United States, sees a rather large number of coal trains every day, to power plants in the Midwest and South. In the southern areas of Alliance there is a large train yard which hosts many of these coal trains.

== Notable people ==
- Jimmy Abegg, visual artist, member of Rich Mullins' A Ragamuffin Band and Vector
- Moon Bloodgood, actress/model; born in Alliance
- David Bunnell, publisher, writer
- Ronald L. Coker, Medal of Honor recipient
- Helen Duhamel, businesswoman and broadcaster, attended St. Agnes Academy in Alliance
- James Emanuel, poet and critic
- Jordan Hooper, basketball player for WNBA's Chicago Sky; born in Alliance
- LeRoy Louden, Nebraska legislator
- Josh McConkey, author, politician, emergency physician, and United States Air Force (USAF) colonel, born in Alliance and attended Alliance High School
- Luke Redfield, singer/songwriter, spent a portion of his youth in Alliance
- Peary Rader, American bodybuilder and magazine publisher from Nebraska. He was the founding publisher of Iron Man from 1936 to 1986. Died in Alliance.
- Tim Walz, 2024 vice presidential candidate, governor of Minnesota, U.S. House of Representatives member, Alliance high school football coach and geography teacher.
- Tony Wilbrand, college basketball player
