= List of therapies =

This is a list of types of medical therapy, including forms of traditional medicine and alternative medicine. For psychotherapies and other behavioral and psychological intervention methods, see list of psychotherapies.

- abortive therapy
- acupressure (some scientific aspects, many prescientific)
- acupuncture (some scientific aspects, many prescientific)
- adjunct therapy
- adjunctive therapy
- adjuvant therapy
- alternative therapy (two senses: a second choice among scientific therapies, or alternative medicine)
- androgen replacement therapy
- animal-assisted therapy
- antibody therapy
- antihormone therapy
- antiserum therapy
- aquarium therapy
- aquatic therapy (nonscientific and scientific forms)
- aromatherapy
- art therapy
- Auger therapy
- aurotherapy
- autism therapies
- autologous immune enhancement therapy
- balneotherapy
- bioidentical hormone replacement therapy (some scientific aspects, some pseudoscientific)
- biotherapy
- blood irradiation therapy
- brachytherapy
- cardiac resynchronization therapy
- cell therapy
- cytotherapy
- cell transfer therapy
- chelation therapy
- chemotherapy
- Chinese food therapy (some scientific aspects, mostly prescientific)
- chiropractic therapy (some scientific aspects, some pseudoscientific)
- chronotherapy (treatment scheduling)
- chrysotherapy
- climatotherapy
- cobalt therapy
- cold compression therapy
- combination therapy
- consolidation therapy
- contrast bath therapy
- counseling
- craniosacral therapy (mostly pseudoscientific)
- cryotherapy
- crystal therapy (mostly pre- and pseudoscientific)
- cupping therapy
- curative therapy
- cytoluminescent therapy (mostly pseudoscientific)
- dark therapy
- definitive therapy
- destination therapy
- diathermy
- diesel therapy (ironic name)
- dietary therapy (various nonscientific and scientific forms)
- drug therapy
- duct tape occlusion therapy (mechanism unknown but has had some scientific study)
- electrohomeopathy (electropathy)
- electroconvulsive therapy
- electromagnetic therapy
- electromagnetic therapy (alternative medicine) (pseudoscientific)
- electron therapy
- electrotherapy
- empiric therapy (two senses, one scientific, one not)
- energy therapy (mostly pre- and pseudoscientific)
- enzyme replacement therapy
- epigenetic therapy
- equine therapy
- estrogen replacement therapy
- exercise therapy
- extracorporeal shockwave therapy
- fast neutron therapy
- Feldenkrais therapy (not entirely scientific, but empirical)
- feminizing hormone therapy
- fluoride therapy
- gene therapy
- gene therapy for color blindness
- gene therapy for epilepsy
- gene therapy for osteoarthritis
- gene therapy in Parkinson's disease
- gene therapy of the human retina
- gold standard therapy
- grape therapy (prescientific and quackery forms)
- Greyhound therapy (ironic name)
- halotherapy (mostly prescientific; see also mineral spa)
- heat therapy
- helminthic therapy
- herbal therapy (prescientific and pseudoscientific forms; compare phytotherapy)
- hippotherapy
- hormone therapy
- hormonal therapy (oncology)
- hormone replacement therapy
- horticultural therapy
- host modulatory therapy
- hydrotherapy (nonscientific and scientific forms)
- hyperbaric oxygen therapy
- hyperthermia therapy
- hypothermia therapy for neonatal encephalopathy
- ichthyotherapy (prescientific but empirical)
- immunosuppressive therapy
- immunotherapy
- induction therapy
- intraoperative electron radiation therapy
- intraoperative radiation therapy
- intravenous immunoglobulin therapy
- intravenous therapy
- inversion therapy
- investigational therapy
- laser therapy
- leech therapy (prescientific and scientific forms)
- light therapy
- lithium therapy
- low level laser therapy
- maggot therapy
- magnet therapy
- magnetic resonance therapy
- maintenance therapy
- manual therapy
- martial arts therapy
- masculinizing hormone therapy
- massage therapy
- medical gas therapy
- medical nutrition therapy
- medical therapy in general contexts means therapy and within medical contexts often means specifically pharmacotherapy
- mesotherapy (pseudoscientific)
- microwave thermotherapy
- mindfullness
- molecular chaperone therapy
- molecular therapy
- monoclonal antibody therapy
- monotherapy
- mud therapy (prescientific)
- music therapy
- negative air ionization therapy
- neoadjuvant therapy
- neurologic music therapy
- Neurotherapy
- neutron capture therapy of cancer
- neutron therapy
- occupational therapy
- oral rehydration therapy
- osmotherapy
- oxygen therapy
- ozone therapy
- palliative therapy
- particle therapy
- pet therapy
- phage therapy
- pharmacotherapy
- phonemic neurological hypochromium therapy
- photodynamic therapy
- phototherapy
- photothermal therapy
- physical therapy
- physiotherapy
- phytotherapy
- platin therapy
- polychemotherapy
- polytherapy
- preventive therapy
- prolotherapy
- prophylactic therapy
- protein therapy
- proton therapy
- pulsed electromagnetic field therapy
- PUVA therapy
- qigong therapy
- quack therapies
- radiation therapy
- radiotherapy
- Recreation Therapy
- rehydration therapy
- rescue therapy
- respiratory therapy
- retail therapy (semifacetious name)
- salt therapy (mostly prescientific; see also mineral spa)
- salvage therapy
- scuba diving therapy
- serotherapy
- sex therapy
- sonodynamic therapy (mostly pseudoscientific)
- sound therapy
- spa therapy (prescientific and pseudoscientific forms)
- speech therapy
- speleotherapy (mostly prescientific; see also mineral spa)
- stem cell therapy
- step therapy
- stepladder therapy
- stepdown therapy
- stereotactic radiation therapy
- supportive therapy
- surf therapy
- systemic therapy
- sweat therapy (mostly prescientific; see also sauna and mineral spa)
- tai chi therapy
- targeted therapy
- thalassotherapy
- thermotherapy
- TK cell therapy
- tolerogenic therapy
- transdermal continuous oxygen therapy
- transgender hormone therapy
- ultraviolet light therapy
- urine therapy (some scientific forms; various prescientific or pseudoscientific forms)
- virotherapy
- wake therapy
- Waon therapy
- water cure therapy

== By therapy composition ==
Treatments can be classified according to the method of treatment:

=== By matter ===
- by drugs: pharmacotherapy, chemotherapy (also, medical therapy often means specifically pharmacotherapy)
- by medical devices: implantation
  - cardiac resynchronization therapy
- by specific molecules: molecular therapy (although most drugs are specific molecules, molecular medicine refers in particular to medicine relying on molecular biology)
  - by specific biomolecular targets: targeted therapy
    - molecular chaperone therapy
  - by chelation: chelation therapy
- by specific chemical elements:
  - by metals:
    - by heavy metals:
      - by gold: chrysotherapy (aurotherapy)
      - by platinum-containing drugs: platin therapy
    - by biometals
      - by lithium: lithium therapy
      - by potassium: potassium supplementation
      - by magnesium: magnesium supplementation
      - by chromium: chromium supplementation; phonemic neurological hypochromium therapy
      - by copper: copper supplementation
  - by nonmetals:
    - by diatomic oxygen: oxygen therapy, hyperbaric oxygen therapy (hyperbaric medicine)
      - transdermal continuous oxygen therapy
    - by triatomic oxygen (ozone): ozone therapy
    - by fluoride: fluoride therapy
    - by other gases: medical gas therapy
- by water:
  - hydrotherapy
  - aquatic therapy
  - rehydration therapy
    - oral rehydration therapy
  - water cure (therapy)
- by biological materials (biogenic substances, biomolecules, biotic materials, natural products), including their synthetic equivalents: biotherapy
  - by whole organisms
    - by viruses: virotherapy
    - by bacteriophages: phage therapy
    - by animal interaction: see animal interaction section
  - by constituents or products of organisms
    - by plant parts or extracts (but many drugs are derived from plants, even when the term phytotherapy is not used)
      - scientific type: phytotherapy
      - traditional (prescientific) type: herbalism
    - by animal parts: quackery involving shark fins, tiger parts, and so on, often driving threat or endangerment of species
    - by genes: gene therapy
      - gene therapy for epilepsy
      - gene therapy for osteoarthritis
      - gene therapy for color blindness
      - gene therapy of the human retina
      - gene therapy in Parkinson's disease
    - by epigenetics: epigenetic therapy
    - by proteins: protein therapy (but many drugs are proteins despite not being called protein therapy)
    - by enzymes: enzyme replacement therapy
    - by hormones: hormone therapy
      - hormonal therapy (oncology)
      - hormone replacement therapy
        - estrogen replacement therapy
        - androgen replacement therapy
        - hormone replacement therapy (menopause)
        - transgender hormone therapy
          - feminizing hormone therapy
          - masculinizing hormone therapy
      - antihormone therapy
        - androgen deprivation therapy
    - by whole cells: cell therapy (cytotherapy)
      - by stem cells: stem cell therapy
      - by immune cells: see immune system products below
    - by immune system products: immunotherapy, host modulatory therapy
      - by immune cells:
        - T-cell vaccination
        - cell transfer therapy
        - autologous immune enhancement therapy
        - TK cell therapy
      - by humoral immune factors: antibody therapy
        - by whole serum: serotherapy, including antiserum therapy
        - by immunoglobulins: immunoglobulin therapy
          - by monoclonal antibodies: monoclonal antibody therapy
  - by urine: urine therapy (some scientific forms; many prescientific or pseudoscientific forms)
  - by food and dietary choices:
    - medical nutrition therapy
    - grape therapy (quackery)
- by salts (but many drugs are the salts of organic acids, even when drug therapy is not called by names reflecting that)
  - by salts in the air
    - by natural dry salt air: "taking the cure" in desert locales (especially common in prescientific medicine; for example, one 19th-century way to treat tuberculosis)
    - by artificial dry salt air:
      - low-humidity forms of speleotherapy
      - negative air ionization therapy
    - by moist salt air:
      - by natural moist salt air: seaside cure (especially common in prescientific medicine)
      - by artificial moist salt air: water vapor forms of speleotherapy
  - by salts in the water
    - by mineral water: spa cure ("taking the waters") (especially common in prescientific medicine)
    - by seawater: seaside cure (especially common in prescientific medicine)
- by aroma: aromatherapy
- by other materials with mechanism of action unknown
  - by occlusion with duct tape: duct tape occlusion therapy

=== By energy ===
- by electric energy as electric current: electrotherapy, electroconvulsive therapy
  - Transcranial magnetic stimulation
  - Vagus nerve stimulation
- by magnetic energy:
  - magnet therapy
  - pulsed electromagnetic field therapy
  - magnetic resonance therapy
- by electromagnetic radiation (EMR):
  - by light: light therapy (phototherapy)
    - ultraviolet light therapy
      - PUVA therapy
    - photodynamic therapy
      - photothermal therapy
      - cytoluminescent therapy
    - blood irradiation therapy
    - by darkness: dark therapy
    - by lasers: laser therapy
      - low level laser therapy
  - by gamma rays: radiosurgery
    - Gamma Knife radiosurgery
    - stereotactic radiation therapy
    - cobalt therapy
  - by radiation generally: radiation therapy (radiotherapy)
    - intraoperative radiation therapy
    - by EMR particles:
      - particle therapy
        - proton therapy
        - electron therapy
          - intraoperative electron radiation therapy
          - Auger therapy
        - neutron therapy
          - fast neutron therapy
          - neutron capture therapy of cancer
    - by radioisotopes emitting EMR:
      - by nuclear medicine
      - by brachytherapy
  - quackery type: electromagnetic therapy (alternative medicine)
- by mechanical: manual therapy as massotherapy and therapy by exercise as in physical therapy
  - inversion therapy
- by sound:
  - by ultrasound:
    - ultrasonic lithotripsy
      - extracorporeal shockwave therapy
    - sonodynamic therapy
  - by music: music therapy
- by temperature
  - by heat: heat therapy (thermotherapy)
    - by moderately elevated ambient temperatures: hyperthermia therapy
      - by dry warm surroundings: Waon therapy
      - by dry or humid warm surroundings: sauna, including infrared sauna, for sweat therapy
  - by cold:
    - by extreme cold to specific tissue volumes: cryotherapy
    - by ice and compression: cold compression therapy
    - by ambient cold:
      - hypothermia therapy for neonatal encephalopathy (in newborns)
      - targeted temperature management (therapeutic hypothermia, protective hypothermia)
  - by hot and cold alternation: contrast bath therapy

=== By procedure and human interaction ===
- Surgery
- by counseling, such as psychotherapy (see also: list of psychotherapies)
  - systemic therapy
  - by group psychotherapy
- by cognitive behavioral therapy
  - by cognitive therapy
  - by behaviour therapy
    - by dialectical behavior therapy
  - by cognitive emotional behavioral therapy
- by cognitive rehabilitation therapy
- by family therapy
- by education
  - by psychoeducation
  - by information therapy
- by speech therapy, physical therapy, occupational therapy, vision therapy, massage therapy, chiropractic or acupuncture
- by lifestyle modifications, such as avoiding unhealthy food or maintaining a predictable sleep schedule
- by coaching

=== By animal interaction ===
- by pets, assistance animals, or working animals: animal-assisted therapy
  - by horses: equine therapy, hippotherapy
  - by dogs: pet therapy with therapy dogs, including grief therapy dogs
  - by cats: pet therapy with therapy cats
- by fish: ichthyotherapy (wading with fish), aquarium therapy (watching fish)
- by maggots: maggot therapy
- by worms:
  - by internal worms: helminthic therapy
  - by leeches: leech therapy
- by immersion: animal bath

=== By meditation ===
- by mindfulness: mindfulness-based cognitive therapy

=== By reading ===
- by bibliotherapy

=== By creativity ===
- by expression: expressive therapy
  - by writing: writing therapy
    - journal therapy
- by play: play therapy
- by art: art therapy
  - sensory art therapy
  - comic book therapy
- by gardening: horticultural therapy
- by dance: dance therapy
- by drama: drama therapy
- by recreation: recreational therapy
- by music: music therapy

=== By sleeping and waking ===
- by deep sleep: deep sleep therapy
- by sleep deprivation: wake therapy

== See also ==
- List of psychotherapies
- Public health
- Therapeutic jurisprudence
