= Arlene Lennox =

American medical physicist

- Born: Arlene Judith Lennox; 1942; Cleveland, Ohio
- Died: 2008 (aged 65–66)
- Scientific career
- Fields: Medical physics

Arlene Judith Lennox (1942–2008) was an American medical physicist. Known for her work on neutron therapy for cancer patients at Fermilab, she became "one of the world's experts on neutron therapy", and her work was featured in the 2009 documentary The Matter of Everything.

== Education and career ==
Lennox was born in Cleveland, Ohio. She was educated at an all-girl Catholic high school, entered a convent as a novitiate at age 14, finished high school at age 15, and became an undergraduate at Notre Dame College in Ohio at age 16. She studied there to become a high school mathematics and science teacher, and taught for six years, beginning at age 17. She spent the last two summers of this period studying for a master's degree at the University of Notre Dame in Indiana, supported by a National Science Foundation program aimed at improving the quality of national science education. She was invited to continue at the University of Notre Dame as a doctoral student, becoming the only woman in her class and one of only two women in the physics program there.

Her doctoral research was performed in collaboration with the Argonne National Laboratory. After completing her doctorate she came to Fermilab as a postdoctoral researcher in 1974, and ended up spending the rest of her career there, asking to be released from her vows when her order tried to reassign her to other duties in 1976. From 1974 to 1985 she worked on basic physics as part of the development of a lithium lens, used to focus antiprotons as part of the development of an antiproton source at the laboratory. In 1985, that project was completed, and in the same year, the laboratory's neutron therapy facility, founded in 1976, shifted focus from a grant-funded research facility to a fee-based medical facility; as part of a major reorganization at the laboratory, she was reassigned to be a manager and medical physicist at the neutron therapy facility. She continued there, becoming head of the program, until retiring shortly before her death.

== Recognition ==
In 2003, Lennox was named a Fellow of the American Physical Society (APS) "for her leadership in the field of neutron therapy".

== Personal life ==
Lennox married David P. Eartly, another Fermilab physicist, in 1977. She died of breast cancer on May 24, 2008.
