= Serotonin hypothesis =

Serotonin hypothesis may refer to:

- Serotonin hypothesis of depression (see Biology of depression#Monoamines)
- Serotonin hypothesis of OCD (see Obsessive–compulsive disorder#Neurobiological)
- Wake therapy#Serotonin hypothesis
