= DTOT =

DTOT may refer to:

- Duct tape occlusion therapy, a method for treating warts by keeping them covered with duct tape for an extended period
- Don't Tread on This, a United States Soccer supporters group on Facebook
- "Don't Tread on This" is a 2006 song by United States Soccer player Clint Dempsey
