= MolMed =

Biotechnology company in Milan, Italy

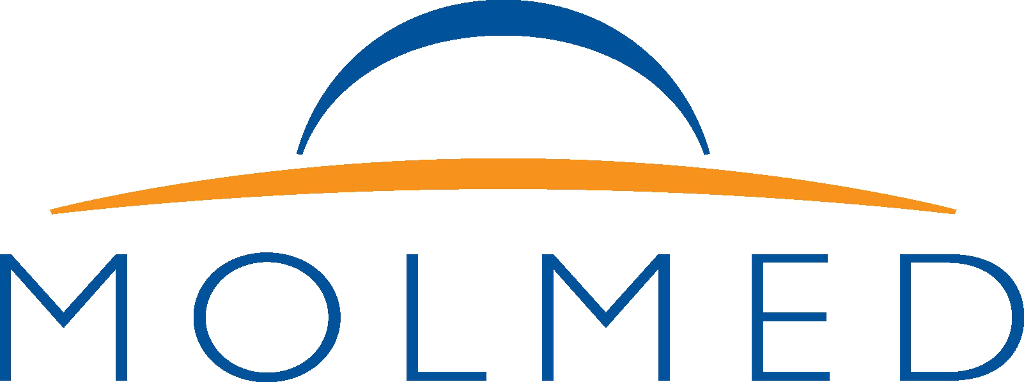

MOLMED is an Italian biotechnology company founded in 1996 in Milan, where it has its registered and operational headquarters. It originally operated as a contract manufacturing organization, and provided other services for companies developing gene therapy and cell therapy products. In 2000, the company changed its business model and started to develop products of its own. It is now focused on research, development, and clinical validation of innovative therapies for the treatment of cancer.

Its headquarters are located within the San Raffaele Biomedical Science Park (which includes the hospital of the same name, a research institute, and a private university), and an operational site in Bresso at OpenZone.

== History ==
The company was founded by Claudio Bordignon in 1996 as a joint venture between Science Park Raf and Boehringer Mannheim.

During its first three years, during which the acquisition of Boehringer Mannheim by Roche took place, Roche sold its stake in MolMed to the venture capital fund EDCP.

In 2001, MolMed signed an agreement with San Raffaele Hospital which gave MolMed an option to license any gene therapy or cell therapy invention made at the hospital in the fields of cancer and HIV.

In 2002 the company acquired and incorporated Genera S.p.A., the research company of the San Raffaele Scientific Institute, and in 2004 three major Italian private investors joined MolMed's shareholder base: Fininvest, Herule Finance (later H-Equity S.r.l.), and La Leonardo Finanziaria (now Delfin S.à r.l.), through a capital increase of 20 million euros.

In 2006 a capital increase of 16 million euros took place and in 2007 another of 10 million euros, leading up to the company's stock market listing in 2008 with a public offering (IPO) of 25% of its shares, through which 56 million euros were raised before expenses. The total number of shares issued was 105,207,808 (100% ordinary shares without nominal value). Finally, in 2010 a rights issue capital increase was carried out (58 million euros before expenses), with one new share issued for each share outstanding, for a total of 210,415,616 shares issued (100% ordinary shares without nominal value).

In early 2015, MolMed partnered with GlaxoSmithKline related to GSK's acquisition of Strimvelis; MolMed had been involved in the early development of the product. In March 2020, Fininvest, the reference shareholder with 23.13%, announced its intention to participate in the total takeover bid of the Japanese Agc (Mitsubishi) at the price of 0.518 euros per share, with a 110% premium compared to the price recorded in the session of the previous day (0.24 euro). As of 2020, the company is known as AGC Biologics.

In March 2020 Fininvest, the reference shareholder with 23.13%, announced that it would join the full takeover bid by the Japanese company AGC (Mitsubishi) at a price of €0.518 per share, with a premium of 110% compared with the price recorded in the previous trading session (€0.24). The offer valued the entire company at €240 million. For Fininvest this represented a capital gain of €30 million. H-Invest (1.52%), owned by Ennio Doris, also joined the transaction. At the end of the takeover bid the company's shares were delisted.

== Products ==
MolMed's product portfolio includes antitumor therapeutics in clinical and preclinical development:

- TK, a cell therapy that allows bone marrow transplantation from donors partially compatible with the patient. On 24 June 2016 it obtained a positive opinion from the CHMP for conditional marketing authorization for Zalmoxis (the commercial name of TK) in Europe. On 18 August 2016 Zalmoxis received conditional marketing authorization (Conditional Marketing Authorization – CMA) from the European Commission as an adjunct therapy to haploidentical hematopoietic stem cell transplantation in adult patients suffering from leukemia and other high-risk blood cancers.
- NGR-hTNF, an agent targeting tumor blood vessels, in phase III trials for malignant pleural mesothelioma and in phase II trials for six other indications: colorectal, liver, small-cell lung, non-small-cell lung, and ovarian carcinomas, as well as soft tissue sarcomas.
