= Host modulatory therapy =

Host modulatory therapy is an emerging treatment concept in the management of periodontitis that aims to reduce tissue destruction and stabilise or even regenerate the periodontium by modifying the host response. Historically treatment of periodontitis has been focused on reducing the bacterial challenge. However the outcomes of the conventional treatment procedures like scaling and root planning (SRP) are not always stable or predictable. Periodontal disease is seen as a balance between (1) a persisting bacterial challenge and the proinflammatory destructive events in the tissue and (2) resolution of inflammation and downregulation of destructive processes. The goal is to maximize treatment response by reducing inflammation and inhibiting destructive processes in the tissues which will result in enhanced periodontal stability after conventional periodontal treatments like SRP.

Host modulatory therapy is a means of treating the host's side of the host-bacteria interaction.

== Agents ==
- Non steroidal Anti Inflammatory Drugs

They inhibit prostaglandin E2 formation (PGE2) that is produced by neutrophils, fibroblasts and gingival epithelial cells in response to bacteria. PGE2 upregulates bone resorption by osteoclasts and their levels are higher in patients with periodontal disease than in healthy individuals.

- Bisphosphonate
- Sub antimicrobial doxycycline

Sub antimicrobial doxycycline is 20 mg doxycycline (Periostat) approved and indicated as an adjunct to SRP in the treatment of chronic periodontitis. It is given twice daily for three months for a maximum of nine months. This dosage of doxycycline has cytokine and osteoclasts inhibitory action rather than being antimicrobial.

- Enamel Matrix Protein

These agents not only help improve wound healing but also stimulate regeneration of the lost bone, periodontal ligament and cementum restoring the complete periodontal attachment apparatus. Currently Emdogain is the only approved host modulatory agent of this type.

- Growth Factors
- Bone Morphogenic Proteins
