= Auger therapy =

- Other names: AT
- Specialty: Radioligand therapy

Auger therapy is a form of radiation therapy for the treatment of cancer which relies on low-energy electrons (emitted by the Auger effect) to damage cancer cells, rather than the high-energy radiation used in traditional radiation therapy. Similar to other forms of radiation therapy, Auger therapy relies on radiation-induced damage to cancer cells (particularly DNA damage) to arrest cell division, stop tumor growth and metastasis and kill cancerous cells. It differs from other types of radiation therapy in that electrons emitted via the Auger effect (Auger electrons) are released with low kinetic energy. In contrast to traditional α- and β-particle emitters, Auger electron emitters exhibit low cellular toxicity during transit in blood or bone marrow.

Due to their low kinetic energy, emitted Auger electrons travel over a very short range: much less than the size of a single cell, on the order of less than a few-hundred nanometers. This very short-range delivery of energy permits highly targeted therapies, since the radiation-emitting nuclide will be close to the delivery site (e.g., a DNA strand) to cause cytotoxicity. However, this is a technical challenge; Auger therapeutics must enter their cell-nuclear targets to be most effective. Auger therapeutics are radiolabelled biomolecules, capable of entering cells of interest and binding to specific sub-cellular components. These typically carry a radioactive atom capable of emitting Auger electrons. The Auger electron emission from the atom is stimulated by radioactive decay, or by external pst (primary system therapy, such as X-ray) excitation.

== Auger dose ==
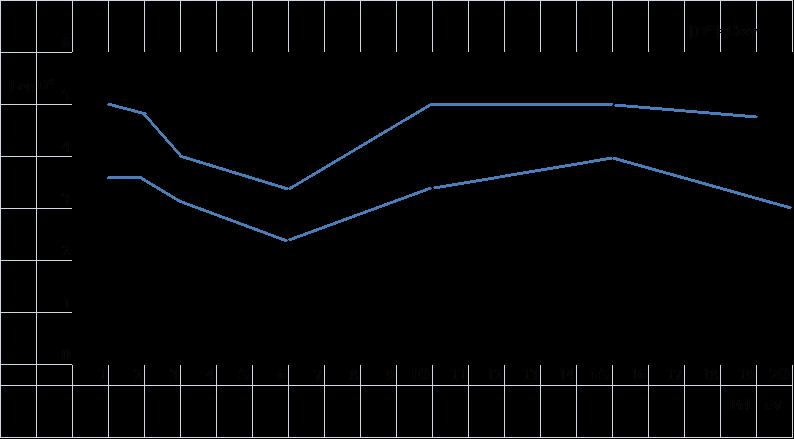
Simulated radiation dose of an electron in water, where the ionization energy of water at ~10 eV shows a resonant dose enhancement. The upper and lower curves are the short and long limiting ranges, respectively. In a vacuum, the kinetic energy 1/2m_{e}v^{2} = 1 eV implies an electron velocity of 6×10^{7} cm/s, or 0.2 percent of the speed of light.

The electron energy in a vacuum may be accurately measured with an electron detector in a Faraday cage, where the bias placed on the cage will accurately define the particle energy reaching the detector. The range of low-energy electrons in tissue or water, particularly electrons at the nanometer scale, cannot be easily measured; it must be inferred, since low-energy electrons scatter at large angles and travel in a zigzag path whose termination distance must be considered statistically and from differential measurements of higher-energy electrons at a much higher range. A 20 eV electron in water, for example, could have a range of 20 nm for 103 Gy or 5 nm for 104.7 Gy. For a group of 9–12 Auger electrons with energies at 12–18 eV in water (including the effect of water ionization at approximately 10 eV), an estimate of 106 Gy is probably sufficiently accurate. The illustration shows the simulated dose calculation in water for an electron using a Monte Carlo random walk which gives up to 0.1 MGy. For a moderately-heavy atom to yield a dozen or more Auger electrons from its inner-shell ionization, the Auger dose becomes 106 Gy per event.

== Candidates for molecular modification with in situ dose ==
With a large, localized dose in situ for molecular modification, the most obvious target molecule is the DNA duplex (where the complementary strands are separated by several nanometers). However, DNA duplex atoms are light elements (with only a few electrons each). Even if they could be induced by a photon beam to deliver Auger electrons, at under 1 keV they would be too soft to penetrate tissue sufficiently for therapy. Mid-range or heavy atoms (from bromine to platinum, for example) which could be induced by sufficiently hard X-ray photons to generate enough electrons to provide low-energy charges in an Auger cascade, will be considered for therapy.

=== Bromine electrons disrupting herpes-specific gene expression ===
When a normal cell transforms, replicating uncontrollably, many unusual genes (including viral material such as herpes genes which are not normally expressed) are expressed with viral-specific functions. The molecule proposed to disrupt the herpes gene is BrdC, where Br replaces a methyl (CH3) with nearly the same ionic radius and location (at the 5th position for BrdU, which has an oxygen molecule at the top). Therefore, BrdC could be oxidized and used as BrdU. Before oxidation, BrdC was unusable as dC or dU in mammalian cells (except for the herpes gene, which could incorporate the BrdC). The bromine atom is made from arsenic, with the addition of an alpha particle in a particle accelerator to form ^{77}Br. It has a half-life of 57 hours and undergoes electron capture: the K-electron is captured by a proton in an unstable nucleus, creating a K hole in Br, and leading to its Auger cascade and disrupting the herpes gene without killing the cell.

This experiment was performed during the 1970s at Memorial Sloan Kettering Cancer Center by Lawrance Helson and C. G. Wang, using 10 neuroblastoma cell cultures, Two cultures were successful in terminating the cell replication with ^{77}Br in vitro, and the experiments were followed by a group of nude mice with implanted tumors.

The in vivo mouse experiments were complicated when the mouse livers cleaved off the sugar component of BrdC rendering the mammalian and herpes genes to incorporate the ^{77}Br-containing base, making no distinction between them. However, the Auger dose with 77BrdC disrupted the herpes-specific gene in several transformed cell cultures.

=== DNA-targeted dose using cisplatin ===
The group of metal-based anticancer drugs originated with cisplatin, one of the leading agents in clinical use. Cisplatin acts by binding to DNA, forming one or two intrastrand cross-links of the G-G adduct at 70% and the A-G adduct at ~20% of the major grooves of the double helix. The planar cis compound (on the same side) is composed of a square molecule with two chloride atoms on one side and two ammonia groups on the other side, centered around the heavy platinum (Pt) which could initiate the Auger dose in situ. Entering a cell with a low NaCl concentration, the aqua-chloride group would detach from the compound (allowing the missing chloride to link the G-G or A-G bases and bend the DNA helixes 45 degrees, damaging them). Although platinum-based antineoplastics are used in as much as 70 percent of all chemotherapy, they are not particularly effective against certain cancers (such as breast and prostate tumors).

The aqua-Cl rationale, detaching the chloride atom from the cisplatin when it enters a cell and binding them to G-G or A-G adducts in the major grooves of the DNA helixes, could be applied to other metals—such as ruthenium (Ru)-chemically similar to platinum. Ruthenium is used to coat the anode target of a mammography X-ray tube, enabling operation at any voltage (22–28 kVp) depending on the compressed thickness of the breast and delivering a high-contrast image. Although ruthenium is lighter than platinum, it can be induced to provide an Auger dose in situ to the DNA adducts and deliver localized chemotherapy.

== Monochromatic X-rays to induce inner-shell ionization ==
=== X-ray tube with transmission target for line emissions ===
Monochromatic X-rays may be channeled from synchrotron radiation, obtained from filtered Coolidge X-ray tubes or from the preferred transmission X-ray tubes. To induce inner-shell ionization with resonant scattering from a moderately-heavy atom with dozens of electrons, the X-ray photon energy must be 30 keV or higher to penetrate tissue in therapeutic applications. Although synchrotron radiation is extremely bright and monochromatic without thermal scattering, its brightness falls off at the fourth power of photon energy. At 15–20 kV or higher an X-ray tube with a molybdenum target, for example, could deliver as much X-ray fluence as a typical synchrotron. A Coolidge X-ray tube brightens by 1.7 kVp and synchrotron brightness decreases by 4 kV, implying that it is not useful for Auger therapy.
