= Halotherapy =

Unproven alternative medicine that uses salt

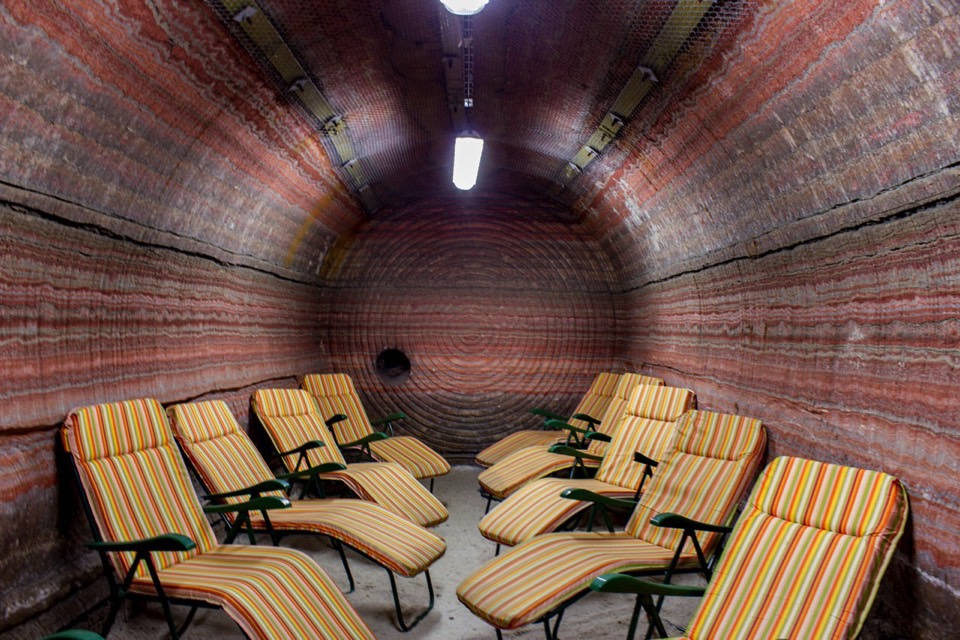
The unique red salt mine in Salihorsk, Belarus.

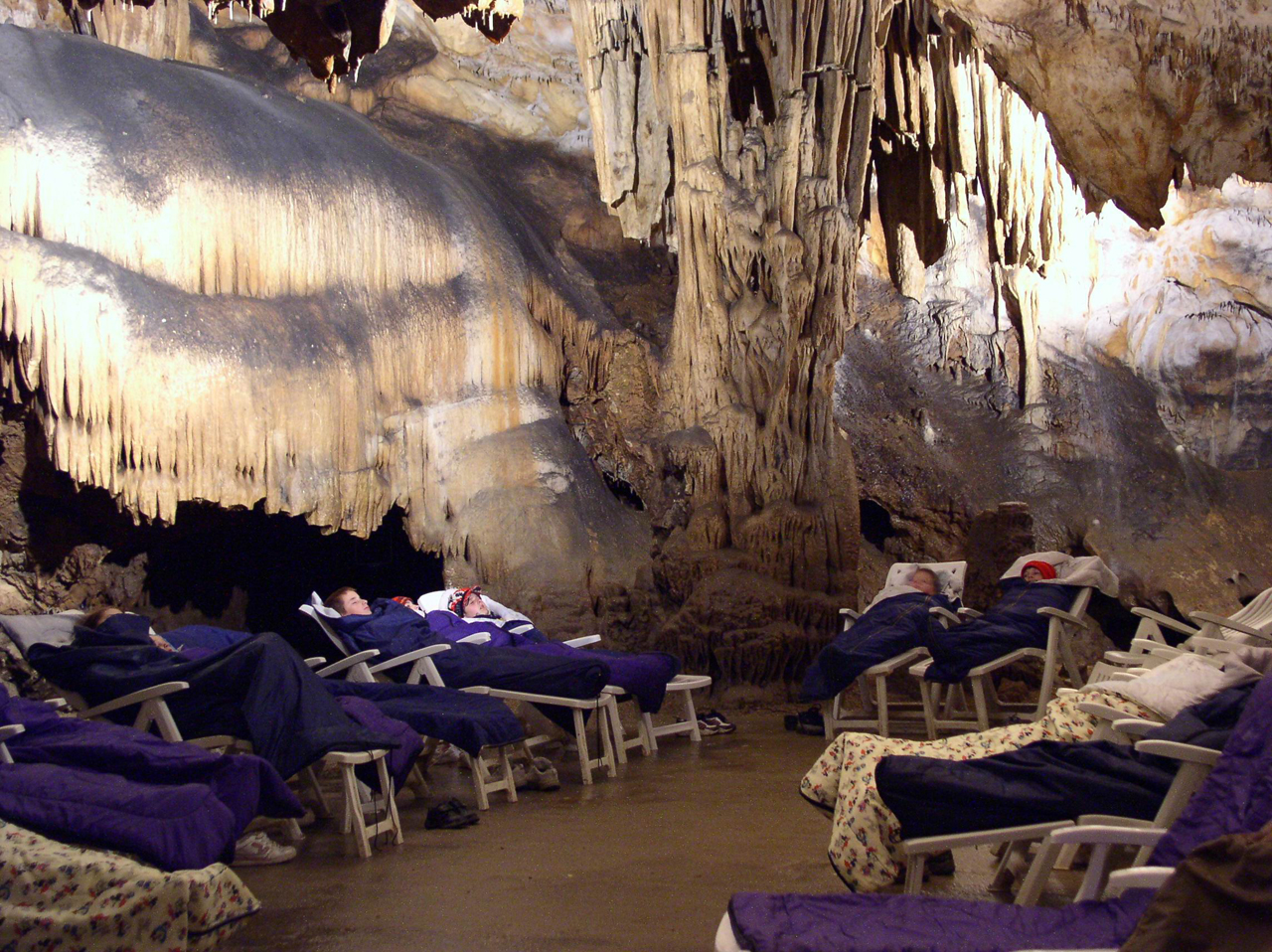
Halotherapy spa in Slovakia

Halotherapy (also known as speleotherapy when practiced inside caves) is a form of alternative medicine which makes use of salt. Halotherapy is an unproven treatment that lacks scientific credibility. Spa owners attribute a wide range of health benefits to halotherapy.

Norman Edelman of the American Lung Association suggests that, for people with obstructive lung diseases, halotherapy might be more than a placebo effect. He speculates that inhaled salt particles might thin out mucus, aiding patients in expelling sputum. However, a recent review of the research supporting halotherapy determined that, out of 151 studies on this topic, only 1 was a well-designed randomized controlled trial that met their inclusion criteria for a meta-analysis.

== History ==
The earliest known mention of spa resorts dates back to the 12th century in Poland, where people were urged to bathe in mineral waters. Modern history of halotherapy dates back to 1843, when a Polish physician named Feliks Boczkowski promoted the idea of salt treatment after noticing that workers at salt mines, unlike other miners, did not have respiratory or lung problems. In those regions with natural karst caves and numerous salt tunnels and salt mines, therapeutic centers for people with asthma have been established since the 1950s, notably in Slovakia, Romania, and Ukraine, in addition to Poland.

== Forms ==
There are several forms of halotherapy:

- Saline solution inhalations
- Dry salt aerosol inhalations
- Irrigation and lavage
- Saline and brine baths
- Taking the waters (crenotherapy)

== See also ==
- Balneotherapy, the medical use of bathing
- Speleotherapy
- Thalassotherapy, the medical use of seawater
