= Stereotactic radiation therapy =

Type of external radiation therapy with positioning at submillimetre precision

- Specialty: Oncology

Stereotactic radiation therapy (SRT), also called stereotactic external-beam radiation therapy and stereotaxic radiation therapy, is a type of external radiation therapy that uses special equipment to position the patient and precisely deliver radiation to a tumor. The total dose of radiation is divided into several smaller doses given over several days. Stereotactic radiation therapy is used to treat brain tumors and other brain disorders. It is also being studied in the treatment of other types of cancer, such as lung cancer. What differentiates stereotactic from conventional radiotherapy is the precision with which it is delivered. There are multiple systems available, some of which use specially designed frames which physically attach to the patient's skull while newer more advanced techniques use thermoplastic masks and highly accurate imaging systems to locate the patient. The result is the delivery of high doses of radiation with sub-millimetre accuracy.

Stereotactic body radiotherapy, sometimes called SBRT is now being used to treat small cell lung cancer, non-small-cell lung cancer and sarcomas (and many other tumors) that have metastasized to the lungs and liver. The high doses used in thoracic SBRT can sometimes cause adverse effects ranging from mild rib fatigue and transient esophagitis, to fatal events such as pneumonitis or hemorrhage. Stereotactic ablative radiotherapy, administers very high doses of radiation, using several beams of various intensities aimed at different angles to precisely target the tumor(s)in the lungs. The images taken from CAT scans and MRIs are used to design a four-dimensional, customized treatment plan that determines each beam's intensity and positioning. The goal is to deliver the highest possible dose of radiation to kill the cancer while minimizing exposure to healthy organs. Since sarcomas often metastasize to the lungs, this treatment is an effective tool in fighting the progression of the disease.
