= Information therapy =

Term related to how information aids therapy

Information Therapy was first cited in the literature to mean "information leading patients in the direction of discovering more about their disease." Later, the term was modified to mean "the therapeutic provision of information to people for the amelioration of physical and mental health and wellbeing," that could lead to a decrease in the utilization of healthcare resources.

In their book Information therapy: Prescribed Information as a Reimbursable Medical Service, authors Donald W. Kemper and Molly Mettler defined the term to mean the right information, to the right person, at the right time, to help make better decisions or to improve a health behavior. Healthwise, Incorporated, a nonprofit organization founded by Kemper and Mettler to develop and supply health educational content for the general public, trademarked the symbol "Ix" to represent the term information therapy.

Studies show that information therapy can improve the knowledge and medical decision-making abilities of patients, as well as reduce patient anxiety.

Human factors engineer, Jeff Greene invented a web-based system that combines information therapy with a patented patient-doctor aligned-incentive mechanism, called the MedEncentive Mutual Accountability and Information Therapy (MAIT) Program. In a five-year study of an employer health plan, the MAIT Program was found to be associated with reductions in annual hospitalizations, emergency room visits, and per capita expenditures of 32%, 14%, and 11%, respectively. Greene coined the term "reward-induced information therapy" to mean providing people with the right information, at the right time, in the right way so they are more knowledgeable and motivated to make better decisions about their health behaviors and medical treatment options.
