= Martial arts therapy =

Martial arts as a treatment for medical disorders

Martial arts Therapy refers to the usage of martial arts as an alternative or complementary therapy for a medical disorder. This can include disorders of the body or of the mind. The therapy may involve applications such as promoting kinaesthetic balance in the elderly or impaired, through tai chi, or reducing aggressiveness in specific populations (Lamarre, 1999).

== History ==
=== Comparison with other methods ===
While more conventional treatments such as weight training and psychotherapy are also of significant benefit, martial arts therapy can embody unique traits that other therapies don’t incorporate into their practice. For example, in children with low self-esteem, this therapy can simultaneously develop areas such as self-defense skills (to defend against physical bullying), physical fitness, instructions on how to handle stressful scenarios in a physical or mental context, and self-confidence, through successful applications of martial technique, such as board-breaking or kata.

One of the crucial features of the therapy is the type of martial art, as well as the lesson plans of the instructor. For instance, a boxing program with a competition-oriented instructor will not provide the same experience as a tai chi instructor who emphasizes mindfulness of one’s actions and thoughts. Although both boxing and tai chi can be defined as martial arts, their histories, emphasis and other features are drastically different. Looking specifically at karate, a kyokushin karate class (which emphasizes full-contact sparring with bare knuckles) versus a shotokan karate class (which places more emphasis on personal discipline and control than fighting), research in this area has not yet determined which particular feature(s) of martial arts are of definite therapeutic value.

=== Psychosocial issues ===
An important issue with martial arts therapy in a psychological context is the distinction between a therapeutic approach and a martial approach to the lessons. With the evolution of martial arts into combat systems (Krav Maga) and combat sports (Kickboxing, Submission Wrestling, Mixed martial arts), many instructors and organizations teach only martial/combative techniques with little (if any) attention to philosophical, spiritual or societal issues. In other words, students may only be taught how to fight without lessons in the proper context for applying these techniques, something that is emphasized in more traditional martial art curricula. Hypothetically, if these philosophical/societal teachings were one of the specific therapeutic factors in martial arts study, studying an art without these teachings would be of little therapeutic benefit, and arguably detrimental to psychological health (Reynes, 2002). Additionally, if not properly informed, a patient undergoing martial arts therapy may erroneously believe they are acquiring martial proficiency when in fact, the curriculum they are learning is unsuitable for self-defense or competitive needs.

Another contentious area is the topic of whether martial arts training promotes or inhibits pro-social behaviours, particularly among youths and adolescents. It has been only within the past 5 years (since 2006) that studies with high-quality methodologies have devoted themselves to this particular topic. Earlier studies had conclusions that suffered from issues such as:

- A lack of follow-up following a study's end (which would help assess long-term efficacy of treatment)
- Missing or mismatched comparison groups to evaluate treatment efficacy compared to control or even general fitness (i.e. martial arts therapy vs. aerobics vs. the control group)
- Little attention to outcomes from the style or type of martial art (few style vs. style comparisons, modern styles vs. traditional, etc.)

It is this last point that appears to be most pertinent to the question of promoting or inhibiting aggressiveness and delinquency among children. Some researchers point towards a catharsis model where practising a martial art enables a person to "burn off" emotional energy to revive themselves. Others claim that under Albert Bandura's social learning theory, receiving praise and benefit for practising violent activities (like some martial arts) reinforces violence in a person and conditions them to be more aggressive and hostile outside of their activity. Endresen & Olweus (2005) recently conducted a study that participating in power sports (which included kick-boxing, boxing, wrestling and weightlifting) "leads to an increase or enhancement of antisocial involvement in the form of elevated levels of violent as well as non-violent antisocial behaviour outside sports." Given that these activities customarily contain few moral/philosophical teachings regarding conduct, this supports a tentative conclusion that traditional martial arts (which do typically offer moral/philosophical teachings) are superior to modern martial arts or combat sport training in reducing antisocial behaviour in children and adolescents.

=== Physical medicine issues ===
In a physical medicine context, the nature of an injury or disorder may disqualify some arts from usage, as their conventional curriculum/focus may be too rigorous. One wouldn’t expect a patient with joint issues to enroll in Brazilian Jiu-Jitsu (which emphasizes techniques to hyper-extend joints to the point of pain submission) or elderly patients to enroll in Muay Thai (which requires a high level of physical fitness and incorporates highly damaging techniques with the elbows, knees, legs, and fists). However, in some cases, curricula were modified so that within these disciplines, martial proficiency was de-emphasized in favor of physical betterment. In one notable study, an Israeli researcher (who was a former Judo champion of Israel) taught a modified form of judo to children that had significant visual and mental impairments (blindness, retardation), and in some cases, physical impairment (such as cerebral palsy). The resulting increase in physical and cognitive abilities of all the children was of greater quantity than other previous forms of physical exercise, in addition to being longer lasting (Gleser, 1992). In Kalarippayattu, Marmachikilsa (Marmam=Vital points) is another expertise achieved by masters who heal the Marma damages –impacts, internal injuries, dislocation, fracture, or paralysis type cases in fight or fall. Course of uzhichil or particular massage with special herbal oil, like ayurvedic model treatment is a routine affair for all Kalari trainees to enhance the flexibility of joints and toning of muscles. Chavitiuzhichil or foot massage is given at the stage of ankathari.

=== Areas for consideration ===
Current trends in research on martial arts' therapeutic benefit points towards generally positive outcomes, especially for physical benefits (one exception to this being possible sustained injuries from competitive applications). But for assessing psychosocial benefits, the evidence is more ambiguous. As with any psychological study, defining concepts such as "happiness", "aggressive attitudes" and "self-confidence" can be a challenging task compared to defining physically related concepts such as "improved cardiovascular health."

A frequent measure used in martial arts research to determine therapeutic outcome is the Profile of Mood States (POMS), created by McNair, Lorr, and Droppleman (1971). This is a 65-item survey that measures 6 distinct mood areas, such as "tension-anxiety" and "anger-hostility." A commonly used methodology in martial arts studies that employed the POMS was to administer it before a set period of martial instruction and after that same period (ranging from a single lesson to several over days/weeks/months). A successful demonstration of therapeutic benefit would be if study participants showed positive, statistically significant changes in their scores from the first administration to the second.

Beyond these issues of construct validity, even if every study of therapeutic martial arts netted a positive outcome (which has not been the case), determining which facets of the instruction were responsible for the change would be vital for widespread application. Potential factors in martial arts could be: cultivating martial ability (being able to fight), philosophical/moral instruction, the proportion of "hard" and "soft" techniques, physical exertion, attainment of rank/status, successful application of techniques in the school, developed friendships with other classmates and any other number of factors. Additionally, the benefit may not be derived from any single factor, but through a unique combination of factors that only martial arts provides. At least one study has shown that compared to students in a sport-specific program, a general fitness program, and a control group, students of a martial arts program derived superior improvement in POMS scores compared to the other three groups.

=== Perspectives ===
Martial arts therapy is a concept still in development. Researchers have yet to conclusively identify the specific features of martial arts that foster a physical or psychosocial benefit. Some have theorized (see Israeli study cited above) that an important feature is the dyadic interplay between students in most arts; the cooperation and response to feedback in practicing techniques such as throws or strikes may have a carryover to cooperation in real-life settings. However, even if all features are conclusively discovered within a specific art or system, there remains the issue of to what extent the instructors within that art/system provide those features to their students.

== See also ==
- Social isolation
- Kalaripayattu

Martial arts psychotherapy and participation in the martial arts has also been suggested that it enhances emotional control, cognitive changes and psychosocial developments (Overchuk 2002)
