= Medical gas therapy =

Administration of gas in medical care

- Other names: Therapeutic gas
- Specialty: Pulmonology gaseous signaling molecules

Medical gas therapy is a treatment involving the administration of various gases. It has been used in medicine since the use of oxygen therapy. Most of these gases are drugs, including oxygen. Many other gases, collectively known as factitious airs, were explored for medicinal value in the late eighteenth century. In addition to oxygen, medical gases include nitric oxide (NO), and helium-O2 mixtures (Heliox). Careful considerations and close monitoring needed when medical gases are in use. For the purpose of this article only gas mixtures are described.

== Nitric oxide ==
Nitric oxide is a substance that our body produces in its every cell and in its every organ. It has a number of functions. It take part in vasodilation, platelet inhibition, immune regulation, enzyme regulation, and neurotransmission.

Inhaled nitric oxide is a gas that is inhaled. It was initially described in 1987 as an "endothelial-derived relaxing factor" and has since been used to treat pulmonary disorders. It works by relaxing smooth muscle to widen (dilate) blood vessels, especially in the lungs. Inhaled nitric oxide selects only pulmonary smooth muscles. There will be no effect or minimal effect of inhaled nitric oxide on atelectatic or fluid-filled lung. It improves oxygenation and decreases pulmonary hypertension. Nitric oxide is used together with a mechanical ventilator to treat respiratory failure in premature infants. In adults nitric oxide can be used in treating pulmonary hypertension with acute respiratory distress syndrome. Thanks to the possible clinical successful outcomes of nitric oxide treatment patients can avoid need for extracorporeal membrane oxygenation treatment. The U.S. Food and Drug Administration has been approved the use of nitric oxide in term and near-term (greater than 34 weeks' gestation age) neonates with hypoxic respiratory failure with clinical or echocardiographic evidence of pulmonary hypertension.

=== Contraindications ===
Nitric oxide must not be used in neonates who depend on right-to-left shunting of blood.

=== Dosing of nitric oxide ===
Dose needed to achieve desired effect but avoid toxicity and adverse effects in neonates and adults is relatively low. Usually it is 5-20 ppm (parts per million). Regular arterial blood gas tests needed to assess the response to the therapy and signs of toxicity. Improvement in partial pressure of oxygen (PO2) and oxygen saturation would be indication of positive response to the nitric oxide therapy. If there is an evidence that nitric oxide works the same dose would be used till the hypoxemia and pulmonary hypertension resolved. When the hypoxemia and pulmonary hypertension resolved titration or slowly weaning of the nitric oxide initiates. Abrupt discontinuation of nitric oxide may lead to compromised oxygenation and pulmonary hypertension may rebound.

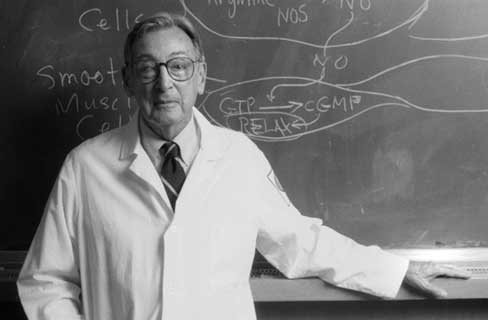
Robert F. Furchgott, PhD

=== Side effects of the nitric oxide therapy ===
Methemoglobins level in the blood increases with the use of nitric oxide. Methemoglobin is abnormal form of molecule which can not carry oxygen. Methemoglobin turns blood brown. Other medications can produce methemoglobin too. Monitoring of methemoglobin needed when nitric oxide is in use.

Nitric oxide with oxygen (O_{2}) in combination produces another by-product chemical compound nitrogen dioxide (NO_{2}). The higher the oxygen concentration and nitric oxide therapy duration and lower ventilator flow rate the higher amount of NO_{2} will be produced. NO_{2} is toxic and its level should always be monitored in nitric oxide therapies. High level of NO_{2} can lead to cell damage, hemorrhage, pulmonary edema.

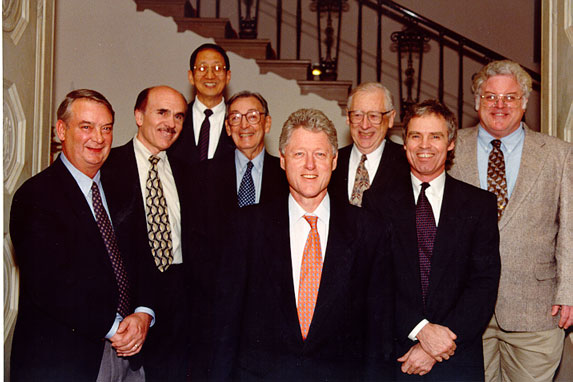
Bill Clinton meets the 1998 Nobel Prize Winners in the White House. From left to right: Ferid Murad, Medicine; Louis Ignarro, Medicine; Daniel Tsui, Physics; Robert Furchgott, Medicine; Bill Clinton, The President; John Pople, Chemistry; Horst L. Störmer, Physics; Robert Laughlin, Physics

Use of nitric oxide in patients with left heart failure or congestive heart failure may lead to pulmonary edema or worsen pulmonary edema.

=== Nobel Prize for Nitric oxide discoveries ===
Three US scientist - Robert F. Furchgott, PhD, Louis J. Ignarro, PhD, and Ferid Murad, MD, PhD won Nobel Prize in Physiology and Medicine for their discovery of nitric oxide role in cardiovascular and nervous systems in 1998. Even though the nitric oxide effects on the body known for more than 25 years the clinical use is still in a development.

== Helium and oxygen ==
In medicine, Heliox generally refers to a mixture of 21% O_{2} (the same as air) and 79% He, although other combinations are available.

Heliox generates less airway resistance than air and thereby requires less mechanical energy to ventilate the lungs. "Work of Breathing" is reduced. It does this by two mechanisms:

1. increased tendency to laminar flow
2. reduced resistance in turbulent flow

The dry air on the Earth we inhale consists of 78.8% nitrogen, 20.95% oxygen and 0.93% argon. Heliox therapy is substitution of nitrogen with helium. Helium itself has no pharmacological value, it does not react in the body. Its only purpose is to make the flow less turbulent and help oxygen to get into the lungs. Less turbulent flow requires less work to breathe.

=== Helium and Heliox properties ===
Helium (He) is colorless, odorless, tasteless, and inert noble gas. Helium is second lightest gas after hydrogen.

Heliox has a similar viscosity to air but a significantly lower density (0.5 g/L versus 1.2 5g/L at STP). Flow of gas through the airways comprises laminar flow, transitional flow and turbulent flow. The tendency for each type of flow is described by the Reynolds number. Heliox's low density produces a lower Reynolds number and hence higher probability of laminar flow for any given airway. Laminar flow tends to generate less resistance than turbulent flow.

In the small airways where flow is laminar, resistance is proportional to gas viscosity and is not related to density and so heliox has little effect. The Hagen–Poiseuille equation describes laminar resistance. In the large airways where flow is turbulent, resistance is proportional to density, so Heliox has a significant effect.

Heliox has been used medically since the early 1930s. It was the mainstay of treatment in acute asthma before the advent of bronchodilators. Currently, heliox is mainly used in conditions of large airway narrowing (upper airway obstruction from tumors or foreign bodies and vocal cord dysfunction). There is also some use of heliox in conditions of the medium airways (croup, asthma and chronic obstructive pulmonary disease).

Patients with these conditions may develop a range of symptoms including dyspnea (breathlessness), hypoxemia (below-normal oxygen content in the arterial blood) and eventually a weakening of the respiratory muscles due to exhaustion, which can lead to respiratory failure and require intubation and mechanical ventilation. Heliox may reduce all these effects, making it easier for the patient to breathe. Heliox has also found utility in the weaning of patients off mechanical ventilation, and in the nebulization of inhalable drugs, particularly for the elderly. Research has also indicated advantages in using helium–oxygen mixtures in delivery of anaesthesia.

=== Heliox side effect ===
Heliox side effect is that inhaled helium change voice. Speech will sound high pitched. This effect is caused by low density gas passing through the vocal cords. The effect is reversible.
