= Transdermal continuous oxygen therapy =

Wound closure technique using external oxygen exposure

- Other names: Transdermal Continuous Oxygen Wound Therapy

Transdermal Continuous Oxygen Therapy (TCOT, also known as Transdermal Continuous Oxygen Wound Therapy) is a wound closure technique for chronic and acute wounds which blankets a wound in oxygen on a 24-hour basis until the wound heals. Unlike hyperbaric oxygen treatment for chronic wounds, oxygen treatment used in this therapy is not systemic in nature and treats only the wound area. This treatment differs from topical oxygen treatments, as topical oxygen typically involves sporadic treatments of 1–3 hours several times per week, while TCOT treatment is 24/7 by nature.

== Overview ==
Though early use focused on burns and surgical wounds, wider use of wounds treated with TCOT have become more common in diabetic foot ulcers, venous stasis and decubitus ulcers (pressure sores). TCOT involves inserting a thin tube which delivers the oxygen above the wound bed of a cleaned wound. An absorbent dressing is then placed above the tube and an occlusive or semi occlusive dressing is placed over the entire wound site. The far end of the tube is connected to an oxygen delivery unit, often portable, which delivers oxygen at a slow rate, typically 3ml per hour.

== Indications ==
Although the FDA has approved treatment for at least one company using TCOT for the following indications, most of the interest in TCOT at present concerns diabetic foot ulcers, venous stasis, and decubitus ulcers.

- Skin ulcers due to diabetes
- Skin ulcers due to venous stasis
- Decubitus ulcers (bed sores, pressure sores)
- Skin ulcers due to post-surgical infections
- Lesions due to gangrene
- Skin grafts
- Burns
- Frostbite

== Effectiveness ==
Animal studies conducted in 2004-2005 have demonstrated the effectiveness of TCOT on Rabbit ear wounds. A recently published study documented two prevented amputations which have shown TCOT to be highly effective on diabetic foot ulcers, venous stasis and decubitus ulcers and a study completed in 2010 by Dr. Gary Sibbald documented the effectiveness of TCOT on 9 diabetic foot ulcer patients. Manufacturers of devices used in TCOT have published several additional cases whereby treatment using TCOT prevented previously scheduled amputations.
