= Autologous immune enhancement therapy =

Treatment method using patient's own immune cells

- Specialty: Immunology/oncology

Autologous immune enhancement therapy (AIET) is a treatment method in which immune cells are taken out from the patient's body which are cultured and processed to activate them until their resistance to cancer is strengthened and then the cells are put back in the body.

Researchers have found that these cells mainly target the cancer cells and not the healthy cells, unlike in chemotherapy and radiotherapy where healthy cells are also destroyed.

== Mechanism of action ==
In AIET, specific types of cells, mainly the NK cells and T lymphocytes, are isolated from the peripheral blood of the cancer patients (during remission in patients who undergo chemotherapy), expanded to 25–30 fold and activated, and then reinfused back into the patient's body. Upon encountering a tumor cell, the activated NK cell attaches to the membrane of the cancer cell and injects toxic granules which dissolve the target cell. The cancer cell dies within minutes and the NK cell moves to the next cancer cell. A single NK cell can destroy up to 27 cancer cells within its lifespan.

== History ==
Adoptive Immuno cell therapy of cancer was first introduced by Steven Rosenberg and his colleagues of National Institute of Health USA. In the late 1980s, they published an article in which they reported a low tumor regression rate (2.6–3.3%) in 1205 patients with metastatic cancer who underwent different types of active specific immunotherapy (ASI), and they suggest that AIET with specific chemotherapy or radiotherapy as the future of cancer immunotherapy. In the beginning Immunotherapy treatments involved administration of cytokines such as Interleukin. with an aim of inducing the lymphocytes which will carry their activity of destroying the tumour cells. Thereafter the adverse effects of such intravenously administered cytokines lead to the extraction of the lymphocytes from the blood and culture-expand them in the lab and then to inject the cells alone enable them destroy the cancer cells. Till date different kinds of autologous and allogenic immune cells such as lymphokine-activated killer (LAK) cells, Natural killer (NK) cells, Activated Cytotoxic T lymphocytes (CTLs), Dendritic cells (DCs), Gene manipulated autologous and allogenic Immune cells have been used in clinical applications of Immunotherapy.

The present technology of AIET was developed by Japanese scientists and it is being widely practised in several Asian countries which uses autologous natural killer (NK) cells and activated T lymphocytes to treat various cancers.

This treatment modality has been in practice since early 90s and has several random clinical trials in lung cancer, gastric cancer, Ovarian cancer and Liver cancer. which has been published with significant disease free survival rates. One of the largest studies in 1400 patients has proven that the cell-based immunotherapy when combined with conventional treatment the efficacy improves by 20–30%. A recent finding published about a relapsed stage IV ovarian cancer treated successfully with this methodology has found its place in the Global medical discovery.

== Status of immunotherapy worldwide ==
Though the concept of AIET started in the US in 1980s, full-fledged clinical treatments on a routine basis have been in practice in Japan since 1990. Randomized controlled studies in different cancers with significant increase in survival and disease free period have been reported. In India immunotherapy has shown positive results in patients with advanced cancer including acute myeloid leukaemia, pancreatic cancer, cervical cancer, ovarian cancer, breast cancer and Philadelphia chromosome Positive Acute Lymphoblastic Leukemia. . In Vietnam, Vinmec Hospital, in Hanoi has completed a series of clinical trials and now offering this treatment to patients.

== Relevance to Autoimmune Diseases ==
Autoimmune diseases like autoimmune hemolytic anemia (AIHA) have been known to be associated with malignancies. In general lower natural killer (NK) cell quantities have been associated with development of cancers. It has been described that the in vitro expansion of NK cells is decreased in cancer patients who have co-existing autoimmune diseases like AIHA.
