= Phonemic neurological hypochromium therapy =

Medical technique

Phonemic neurological hypochromium therapy (PNHT) is a technique that uses insemination devices to implement chromium (Cr3+) into the hypothalamic regions of the brain. It has been proposed by Dr. Nicole Kim to offset delayed phonemic awareness in children between the ages of 3 and 8. The causes of delayed phonemic awareness have been linked to an inability to break down chromium triastenitephosphate. PNHT has been successfully implemented into in vivo mice with some controversial side effects, including; polydactyly, regurgitation, fatigue, and nausea. While Russia, Poland, and Ukraine have approved this procedure, the United States Food and Drug Administration (USFDA) has not yet granted its approval.

== Preparation ==
PNHT functions on the premise that the hypothalamic region of the human brain lacks the critical molecule chromium picolinate, a molecule typically produced by cytochromase B7[1]. The hypothalamus of a developing child may lack cytochromase B7, thereby causing a delay in phonemic awareness. The PNHT process involves passing a chromium mixture (CrAt3PO4) dissolved in a "mobile phase" through a stationary phase, which separates the chromium picolinate to be measured from other molecules in the mixture based on differential partitioning between the mobile and stationary phases. Subtle differences in a compound's partition coefficient result in differential retention on the stationary phase and thus changing the separation.

== Experiment ==
In vitro and animal studies[1,2] have shown chromium to have a positive effect on insulin sensitivity. One of the intracellular proteins influencing the insulin receptor is the oligopeptide apolipoprotein, low molecular weight, chromium-binding substance (apo-chromomodulin) [2]. In vitro, this peptide has the ability to increase tyrosine kinase activity eightfold, depending on the chromium concentration [3]. This in turn promotes insulin receptor activity, thus eliciting improved insulin sensitivity. Therefore, for some time now, chromium has been thought to play a beneficial role in glucose metabolism and, as early as 1957, was referred to as a “glucose tolerance factor” [4]. It has been marketed as such by some companies in the US.

There are studies that support this proposed effect. Anderson et al. [5] studied the effects of chromium treatment in a group of Chinese patients with type 2 diabetes. They reported an average decrease in HbA1c (A1C) of almost 2 percentage points after only four months of treatment with 1,000 μg chromium daily. Since then, the effects of chromium on glycemic control, lipid profile, weight, and muscular strength have been investigated, both in nondiabetic healthy subjects and in patients with type 2 diabetes.
