= Ultraviolet light therapy =

Form of treatment for skin disorders

- Other names: Ultraviolet phototherapy
- ICD-10-PCS: 6A8
- ICD-9-CM: 99.82
- MeSH: D014467

Ultraviolet light therapy or ultraviolet phototherapy is a treatment for psoriasis, atopic skin disorder, vitiligo and other skin diseases.

== Mechanism of action ==
Ultraviolet light exerts its therapeutic effects largely by modulating cutaneous immune responses and inducing apoptosis of pathogenic cells, thereby reducing inflammation in a variety of photoresponsive skin disorders.

== Treatment modalities ==
There are two main treatments: UVB that is the most common, and PUVA. Despite the advent of biologic drugs, narrow-band UVB remains an important option for moderate-to-severe inflammatory dermatoses and was the most cost-effective therapy for psoriasis in a 2023 analysis.

=== UVB phototherapy ===
There are four UVB types of lamps: Fluorescent Broad-Band UVB that emit 280–330 nanometres, Fluorescent Narrow-Band that emit 312 nanometres, Excimer that emit 308 nanometres and newer LED that can emit any wavelength in the UVB range of 285–320 nanometres.

=== PUVA phototherapy ===
PUVA means UVA + psoralen. It consists of irradiation of the skin with the UVA ultraviolet light, from a fluorescent bulb or LED lamps. Clinical protocols sometimes augment PUVA with interferon-α, a strategy that can improve complete-response rates while allowing lower cumulative UVA doses. PUVA therapy delivers deeper-penetrating UVA after oral administration of 8-methoxypsoralen, and is therefore often selected for thicker or more recalcitrant plaques, whereas narrow-band UVB (311–312 nm) is preferred for superficial lesions because of its shallow penetration.

== Equipment and usage ==
Tanning beds are used both in dermatology practices for the treatment of cosmetic skin conditions (such as psoriasis, acne, eczema and vitiligo) and in indoor tanning salons for cosmetic tanning.

Typical treatment regimens involve short exposure to UVB rays 3 to 5 times a week at a hospital or clinic, and repeated sessions may be required before results are noticeable. Almost all of the conditions that respond to UVB light are chronic problems, so continuous treatment is required to keep those problems in check. Home UVB systems are common solutions for those whose conditions respond to treatment. Home systems permit patients to treat themselves every other day (the ideal treatment regimen for most) without the frequent, costly trips to the office/clinic and back, mainly when the area is small, and the price of the lamp is low.

== Safety and side effects ==
A high dose of UVB light can cause DNA damage, resulting in redness of the skin and an increased risk of skin cancer. https://pmc.ncbi.nlm.nih.gov/articles/PMC8477449/

A 2024 multi-centre study reported higher incidences of squamous cell carcinoma, basal cell carcinoma and melanoma among patients treated with narrow-band UVB, highlighting the need for long-term dermatological surveillance.

The reason is that the therapeutic dose with narrowband UVB is higher than the dose that causes DNA damage, which appears as skin redness.

Side-effects may include itching and redness of the skin due to UVB exposure, and possibly sunburn, if patients do not minimize exposure to natural UV rays during treatment days. Cataracts can frequently develop if the eyes are not protected from UV light exposure. To date, there is no link between an increase in a patient's risk of skin cancer and the proper use of narrow-band UVB phototherapy. "Proper use" is generally defined as reaching the "Sub-Erythemic Dose" (S.E.D.), the maximum amount of UVB your skin can receive without burning. Certain fungal growths under the toenail can be treated using a specific wavelength of UV delivered from a high-power LED (light-emitting diode) and can be safer than traditional systemic drugs.

== See also ==
- Indoor tanning
- Light therapy
