= Step therapy =

Managed care approach to prescription

Step therapy, also called step protocol or a fail first requirement, is a managed care approach to prescription. It is a type of prior authorization requirement that is intended to control the costs and risks posed by prescription drugs. The practice begins medication for a medical condition with the most cost-effective drug therapy and progresses to other more costly or risky therapies only if necessary.

The increase in prescription drug prices in the United States has increased the pressure on health care providers to keep down the cost of prescription medication while maintaining high levels of availability to the patient. The use of generic drugs whenever possible allows health care plans to pursue both goals effectively.

Physicians and managed care providers may disagree on the proper step therapy, and patients are encouraged to become knowledgeable in managing their own care.

== Opponents ==
Opponents of step therapy, such as Fail First Hurts, have detailed the pitfalls of step therapy. "Fail First is used by health insurers to control costs. It is time-consuming from a physician and patient standpoint, is more expensive from a direct and indirect out-of-pocket cost perspective, denies patients the drugs they need when they need them, and allows payers to practice medicine without a license." They claim that it also has the following disadvantages:

- Creating additional barriers, leading people to forgo needed medications
- Possibly causing patients' medical conditions to deteriorate, increasing the need for later medical intervention in the future, thus making patients require increasingly-costly medical care
- Increasing frustration and incidents of depression
- Increasing the risk of non-compliance and self-medication

== See also ==
- Health care in the United States
- Prescription drug
- Prescription drug prices in the United States
