= Gene therapy in Parkinson's disease =

Therapy for the treatment of Parkinson's disease

Gene therapy in Parkinson's disease consists of the creation of new cells that produce a specific neurotransmitter (dopamine), protect the neural system, or the modification of genes that are related to the disease. Then these cells are transplanted to a patient with the disease. There are different kinds of treatments that focus on reducing the symptoms of the disease but currently there is no cure.

== Current treatments ==
Parkinson's disease (PD) is a progressive neurological disorder resulting from the death of cells in the substantia nigra that contain and produce dopamine. People with PD may develop disturbance in their motor activities. Some activities can be tremor or shaking, rigidity and slow movements (bradykinesia). Patients may eventually present certain psychiatric problems like depression and dementia. Current pharmacological intervention consist on the administration of L-dopa, a dopamine precursor. The L-dopa therapy increases dopamine production of the remaining nigral neurons. Other therapy is the deep brain electrical stimulation to modulate the overactivity of the subthalamic nucleus to the loss of dopamine signaling in the stratum. However, with this treatment, the number of substantia nigra neurons decrease so it becomes less efficient.

These treatments try to reduce the symptoms of the patient focusing on increasing the production of dopamine but they do not cure the disease. The new treatments for PD are in clinical trials and most of them are centered on gene therapy. With this, researchers expect to compensate the loss of dopamine or to protect the dopamine neurons from degeneration. The pharmacological and surgical therapies for PD focus on compensating the ganglia dysfunction caused by the degeneration of the dopaminergic neuron from substantia nigra.

== Gene therapy background ==
There are many new PD treatments in clinical trials and several of those are focusing on gene therapeutic approaches that compensate the loss of dopamine or protect the nervous system dopamine neurons from degeneration. There are some important reasons for focusing on gene therapy as a treatment for PD. First of all, currently there is no cure for this disease. Secondly, some genes have been identified which can modulate the neuron phenotype or act as neuroprotective agents. Also, the environment of the brain cannot afford repeated injections into the region where the substantia nigra meets the striatum, the nigrostriatum. Therefore, gene therapy could be a single treatment appealing, viral vectors used in the therapy are diffusible and capable to do transduction of the striatum.

== Gene therapy bases ==
The main idea of the gene therapy is to create new generations of cells that produce particular neurotransmitter (dopamine) and then transplant these cells to the patients with PD. This is because the neurons cannot proliferate nor be renewed; and replacing lost neurons it is a process that is currently going under investigation. Also, the use of embryonic dopaminergic cells cannot be used because these cells are difficult to obtain and modifications of cell can only be made on somatic cells, not germline. With the modifications of the transplanted cell, there can be a change in the expression of the genes or normalize them.

== Types of gene therapy ==
There are several types of gene therapy. There are therapies for symptomatic approaches like the production of ectopic L-dopa, the full ectopic dopamine synthesis, the ectopic L-dopa conversion or the use of glutamic acid descarboxylase (GAD). Also there are disease modifying therapies like NTN or GNDF (glial cell line-derived neurotrophic factor), the regulation of the α-synuclein and Parkin gene expression. Currently the main studies are using AAV2 as a vector platform, making it the standard vector for this disease although a lentevirus has also been used. In the different types of the gene therapy, the investigations are encoding enzymes that are necessary for dopamine synthesis, such as tyrosine hydroxylase, GTP cyclohydrolase 1 and AADC.

=== Symptomatic approaches ===
A symptomatic approach is a treatment focused on the symptoms of the patients. The first one, consists in the ectopic dopamine synthesis. Here, the production of ectopic L-dopa in the striatum is another alternative gene therapy. This therapy consists on transferring the TH and GTP cyclohydrolase 1 genes into the MSNs because the endogenous AADC activity is able to convert the L-dopa into dopamine. In an experiment in 2005, using tyrosine hydroxylase (TH) and GCH1 altogether with vectors, they could provide normal levels of L-dopa to rats. The results of this experiment showed reduced dyskinesias by 85% as well as, the reversion view of abnormal projections in the striatum using the TH-GCH1 gene transfer.

Dopamine synthesis can be fully ectopic. In this case, the enzyme AADC it is in charge of converting the levodopa to dopamine. In Parkinson disease, the loss of neurons from the nigrostriatum leads to the inability to convert levodopa to dopamine. The goal of AAV2-hAADC is to restore normal levels of AADC in the striatum so there could be more conversion of levodopa, and therefore reducing levodopa- induced dyskinesia. Using the gene therapy, in 2012, an experiment was accomplish with primates testing tyrosine hydroxylase (TH) transgene in primate astrocytes. Gene therapy was made with the transfer of a TH full-length cDNA using rat TH. The results showed behavioural improvement in the monkeys that received the plasmid, unlike the control monkey.

Another type is the ectopic L-dopa conversion in which they use a gene enzyme replacement therapy that can be used to increase the efficacy of the pharmacological L-dopa therapy by using AAV vectors. This AAV vectors have been designed to send the AADC coding sequence to the MSN (medium spiny neurons) in the striatum to be able to convert administered L-dopa into dopamine.

Other kind of gene therapy as a symptomatic approach is the use of glutamic acid decarboxylase (GAD) expression in the subthalamic nucleus. This is a gene enzyme replacement therapy that can be used to increase the efficacy of the pharmacological L-dopa therapy by using AAV vectors. This AAV vectors have been designed to send the AADC coding sequence to the MSN in the striatum to be able to convert administered L-dopa into dopamine. A phase 2 study, published in the journal Lancet Neurology Parkinson, says that a gene therapy called NLX-P101 dramatically reduces movement damage. In this study, they used glutamic acid decarboxylase (GAD). They introduced genetic material in the brain related to motor functions. The symptoms included tremor, stiffness and difficulty in movements; and were improved in half of the group in gene therapy, while in the control group, 14% improved them.

=== Disease modifying ===
There are therapies in development based in the modification of the disease. The first one is the neurotrophic factors gene delivery. In this therapy, GNDF or NTN are used to protect the system. GNDF is a factor of the TGFβ superfamily, is secreted by astrocytes (glia cells that are in charge of the survival of the midbrain dopaminergic neurons) and is homologous to NTN, persephin and artemin. Preclinical studies of the nigrostriatal dopaminergic in relation to Parkinson disease system have shown that GNDF and NTN are very potential neuroprotective agents. Another type in the disease's modification technique is the synuclein silencing. Some cases of PD were related to polymorphisms in the α-synuclein promoter and also in the multiplication of the locus that carries the α-synuclein gene. Therefore, trying to down-regulate the α-synuclein expression could impact the development of the disease. There have been explored several viral vector-based gene delivery system that interfere with α- synuclein expression, and they depend on the interference of the RNA (destabilizing the α-synuclein RNAm) and/or the block the protein translation (using short hairpin RNA or micro RNA directed against the α-synuclein RNAm sequence).

The discovery of the Parkin gene is another type of modification of PD. The Parkin gene is linked with mutations associated with autosomal recessive juvenile parkinsonism (previous state of Parkinson with the typical symptoms and pathology but with a slow progression). The mutations in the Parkin gene are responsible for the development of the autosomal recessive juvenile parkinsonism.

== New projects and investigations ==
More gene therapy trials have been conducted for PD (with the adeno-associated virus 2 gene), the objectives and strategies used on the actual researches are clear, the research tries to translate the experience obtained during the trials and try to improve the development of new technology for the gene therapy of PD.
