= Cytoluminescent therapy =

Cancer treatment

Cytoluminescent therapy is a proposed cancer treatment as a form of photodynamic therapy (PDT) and neurotherapy characterized by a photosensitiser that is supposedly eliminated from normal tissue but selectively accumulated in neoplastic and dysplastic tissue. This is followed by whole body irradiation with light of the specific wave length which activates the photosensitiser. The result is supposed to be selective damage or elimination of tumor cells while normal tissues are unharmed. However, tests as of 2003 did not show any positive clinical effects in a group of 48 patients treated in this way.

The original providers of CLT in Killaloe, Ireland, are no longer performing the treatment. Much of their claims of effectiveness were based upon anecdotal reports, not research. In fact, the wavelength of light used to active the chlorophyll-derived photosensitizer used in CLT is incapable of penetrating tissue more than several millimeters. The FDA-approved therapy PDT uses red light (wavelength approximately 600-700 nm) and penetrates human tissue up to 2 centimeters. No wavelength can fully penetrate the human body, as the purveyors of CLT claimed.
