= Peak kilovoltage =

Peak voltage across an X-ray tube

Peak kilovoltage (kVp) refers to the maximum high voltage applied across an X-ray tube to produce the X-rays. During X-ray generation, surface electrons are released from a heated cathode by thermionic emission. The applied voltage (kV) accelerates these electrons toward an anode target, ultimately producing X-rays when the electrons are stopped in the anode. Thus, the kVp corresponds to the highest kinetic energy of the electrons striking the target, and is proportional to the maximum photon energy of the resulting X-ray emission spectrum. In early and basic X-ray equipment, the applied voltage varies cyclically, with one, two, or more pulses per mains AC power cycle. One standard way to measure pulsating DC is its peak amplitude, hence kVp. Most modern X-ray generators apply a constant potential across the X-ray tube; in such systems, the kVp and the steady-state kV are identical.

kVp controls the property called "radiographic contrast" of an X-ray image (the ratio of transmitted radiation through regions of different thickness or density). Each body part contains a certain type of cellular composition which requires an X-ray beam with a certain kVp to penetrate it. The body part is said to have "subject contrast" (that is, different cellular make up: some dense, some not so dense tissues all within a specific body part). For example: bone to muscle to air ratios in the abdomen differ from those of the chest area. So the subject contrast is said to be higher in the chest than in the abdomen. In order to image the body so that the maximum information will result, higher subject contrast areas require a higher kVp so as to result in a low radiographic contrast image, and vice versa.

Although the product of tube current and exposure time, measured in milliampere-seconds (mA·s), is the primary controlling factor of radiographic density, kVp also affects the radiographic density indirectly. As the energy (which is proportional to the peak voltage) of the stream of electrons in the X-ray tube increases, the X-ray photons created from those electrons are more likely to penetrate the cells of the body and reach the image receptor (film or plate), resulting in increased film density (compared to lower energy beams that may be absorbed in the body on their way to the image receptor). However, scattered X-rays also contribute to increased film density: the higher the kVp of the beam, the more scatter will be produced. Scatter adds unwanted density (that is, density that does not bring pertinent information to the image receptor). This is why kVp is not primarily used to control film density – as the density resulting from increasing kVp exceeds what is needed to penetrate a body part, it only adds useless photons to the image.

Increasing mAs causes more photons (radiation) of the particular kVp energy to be produced. This is helpful when larger body parts are imaged, because they require more photons. The more photons that pass through a particular tissue type (whose kVp is interacting at the cellular level), the more photons reach the image receptor. The more photons that pass through a part and reach the image receptor with pertinent information, the more useful the film density on the resulting image. Conversely, lower mAs creates fewer photons, which will decrease film density, but is helpful when imaging smaller parts. The measurement of kVp is done by kV meter. The quality of X-ray tube depends upon the kV applied across the filament at the target. A slight change in kV affects the image significantly. Therefore, it is necessary to measure kV applied to tube accurately.
