= Antihormone therapy =

- Specialty: Endocrinology

Antihormone therapy is a type of hormone therapy that suppresses selected hormones or their effects, in contrast with hormone replacement therapy, which encourages hormone activity.

The suppression of certain hormones can benefit patients with certain cancers because certain hormones prompt or help the growth of a tumor. This is especially true in cancers relating to the sex organs.

Hormones are made by glands and circulated through the bloodstream. Hormones may act as a signal to cells to grow by attaching to them. Antihormone therapy blocks hormones from sending these messages to cells. If a diagnostic test shows cancer in places with hormones attached, drugs may be prescribed to the patient to block the receptors and inhibit the growth of cancer cells. Most antihormone therapies are administered by pill for 5 to 10 years after surgery.

== Origin ==
Hormone replacement therapy began in the 1960s but gained traction in the late 1990s. Therapy methods have been developed rapidly since the 1970s, and survivorship of individuals with hormone receptor-positive cancer has skyrocketed. In more recent years, since the 1990s, new classes of drugs have been released and greatly changed the way hormonal cancers, like prostate and breast cancer, are treated. Research to understand how hormones influence the growth of cancer cells has prompted researchers to find new ways to use drugs to prevent and treat hormone receptor-positive cancer cells by limiting the production of sex hormones. These methods of hormone suppression have opened the door for pioneering new cancer chemoprevention drugs.

== Types of Antihormone Therapy ==
=== SERMs (selective estrogen receptor modulator) and SERDs (selective estrogen receptor degrader) ===
==== Tamoxifen and Toremifene ====
Tamoxifen is a SERM and is one of the most common and oldest forms of hormone therapy. When breast cancer is found at an early stage or found to be Metastatic breast cancer, tamoxifen can be prescribed to selectively block estrogen's effect on certain cells. SERMs like tamoxifen attach to receptors on the cancer cells which blocks estrogen from attaching to the receptors. Tamoxifen is successful in lowering breast cancer reoccurrence rates, breast cancer occurrence in the opposite breast, and death from breast cancer in cases of hormone receptor-positive and hormone-sensitive cancer. Tamoxifen is also thought to lower the risk of breast cancer in those who have a predisposition or at risk. Tamoxifen may be used in pre and postmenopausal women. Toremifene is a similar SERM drug to tamoxifen, but is less common and only approved for treatment of metastatic cancer. Toremifene is generally prescribed once tamoxifen is no longer effective.

==== Fulvestrant (Faslodex) ====
Fulvestrant is a SERD drug that acts by damaging and blocking estrogen receptors. Fulvestrant is currently only approved by the FDA to treat cancer in postmenopausal women, but it is often prescribed off-label in combination with and LHRH agonist in premenopausal women to halt the functionality of the ovaries. Fulvestrant is administered via injection in the buttocks.

=== Aromatase inhibitors ===
A group of drugs called aromatase inhibitors are commonly prescribed to postmenopausal women who test positive for hormone receptor-positive cancer. Aromatase in fat and muscle can circulate estrogen in postmenopausal women. Aromatase in highly estrogen-sensitive tissues, such as the breast, uterus, vagina, bone, and blood vessels, provides estrogen locally, so aromatase inhibitors work by reducing this estrogen production.

=== Ovarian Suppression ===
Ovarian suppression is known to slow the growth of hormone receptor-positive breast cancer in premenopausal women and can also help preserve fertility during chemotherapy. Ovarian suppression through drugs temporarily shuts down the ovaries preventing the production of oestrogen, thus slowing the rate of growth of hormone receptor-positive tumors. Ovary suppression may also be achieved through surgical intervention known as an oophorectomy, which removes one or both ovaries sometimes in combination with the fallopian tubes.

=== LHRH Agonist ===
LHRH (luteinising hormone-releasing hormone) agonists block the production of sex hormones in both men and women. In men, LHRH agonists seize testosterone production in the testicles, and in women it blocks the ovaries from producing estrogen and progesterone. These drugs are most commonly used in treatments for prostate cancer.

== Side Effects ==
Side effects of antihormone therapy are generally minimal, but can produce similar feelings to menopause in women. Common symptoms of all antihormone therapies include irregular menstrual cycles, hot flashes, weight gain, vaginal dryness, headaches, mood swings and hair thinning. Less common but more serious drug-specific side effects include:

=== SERMs ===
- Blood clots
- Stroke
- Cataracts
- Uterine cancer
- Decreased libido
- Mood swings and depression

=== Ovarian suppression ===
- Osteoporosis
- Decreased libido
- Mood swings and depression

=== Aromatase Inhibitors ===
- Heart attack, angina, heart failure
- Osteoporosis
- Mood swings and depression

=== Fulvestrant ===
- Gastrointestinal complications (nausea, vomiting, constipation)
- Bone and musculoskeletal pain
- Headache
