= Animal bath =

Therapeutic envelopment

An animal bath or balneum animale is a medical treatment in which the skin or carcass of a freshly slaughtered animal is wrapped around the patient. The idea was that the vitality of the animal might be transferred to the patient and the warmth of the treatment may have had some therapeutic effect.

The treatment has been used since antiquity and was thought to be effective for vulnerable newborn babies and lameness. One notable patient treated in this way was the young Kaiser whose left arm was palsied from birth. The arm was placed in the body of a freshly slaughtered hare for 30 minutes twice a week to encourage it to grow normally.
