= Enamel matrix derivative =

In dentistry, enamel matrix derivative (EMD) is an extract of porcine fetal tooth material used to biomimetically stimulate the soft and hard tissues surrounding teeth to regrow (in a process known as regeneration) following tissue destruction.

== Discovery of EMP's role in cementogenesis ==
There are three hard tissues that comprise human teeth: enamel, dentin and cementum. The majority of the tooth structure is formed from dentin, and the enamel serves as the superficial layer of the crown while the cementum serves to cover the root. In the mid-1990s, however, it was discovered that a very thin layer of enamel actually exists between the dentin and cementum on the roots of adult human teeth. This led researchers to conclude that enamel matrix proteins (or EMPs) laid down by Hertwig's epithelial root sheath serve as precursors to acellular cementum during its formation, known as cementogenesis. The presence of acellular cementum acts to signal the development of periodontal ligament (PDL) fibers, followed by new alveolar bone, thus leading to the formation of the tissues of the periodontium.

== Enamel matrix protein and its derivative ==
Making use of this finding, enamel matrix derivative (EMD) was introduced in 1996. A commercially prepared and purified extract of enamel matrix proteins, EMD is composed primarily of amelogenin and has been shown to promote PDL fibroblast proliferation and growth. Based on the high degree of homology between porcine and human enamel proteins, it was decided to produce the EMD from fetal pigs.

It was marketed as Emdogain by the Swedish company Biora, until Straumann acquired Biora in 2003 and began producing it under the Straumann name.

== Mechanism of action ==
It is still unclear exactly how EMD participates in the regeneration process. But it has been demonstrated that EMD serves to promote periodontal ligament fibroblast proliferation and growth and inhibit epithelial cell proliferation and growth; this is a key feature in EMD-promoted periodontal tissue regeneration, because the faster-growing epithelium will ordinarily compete very successfully for the space once occupied by the periodontal ligament and alveolar bone, leading to tissue repair as opposed to regeneration.

EMD mimics normal root development by stimulating release of autocrine growth factors from periodontal ligament undifferentiated mesenchymal cells. EMD also stimulates osteoprotegerin, serving to trigger osteoblasts and indirectly inhibit both osteoclastogenesis and osteoclastic function, both of which are important in attaining alveolar bone growth in the area of desired regeneration.
