= Contrast bath therapy =

Medical therapy

- Other names: Hot/cold immersion therapy
- Specialty: Physical therapy

Contrast bath therapy is a form of treatment where a limb or the entire body is immersed in hot (but not boiling) water followed by the immediate immersion of the limb or body in cold ice water. This procedure is repeated several times, alternating hot and cold. The only evidence of benefit is anecdotal and no plausible mechanism has been confirmed.

== Theory ==
The theory behind contrast bath therapy is that the hot water causes vasodilation of the blood flow in the limb or body followed by the cold water which causes vasoconstriction. The lymph system, unlike the circulatory system, lacks a central pump. By alternating hot and cold, it is believed that lymph vessels dilate and contract to "pump" and move stagnant fluid out of the injured area and that this positively affects the inflammation process, which is the body's primary mechanism for healing damaged tissue.

== Treatment ==
Contrast bathing can be used to reduce swelling around injuries or to aid recovery from exercise. It can also significantly improve muscle recovery following exercise by reducing the levels of blood lactate concentration. For any injury presenting with palpable swelling and heat, and visible redness - such as a strain/sprain - contrast baths are contraindicated during the acute inflammation stage. Acute inflammation begins at the time of injury and lasts for approximately 72 hours.

== Effectiveness in athletic recovery ==
The current evidence base suggests that contrast water therapy (CWT) is superior to using passive recovery or rest after exercise; the magnitudes of these effects may be most relevant to an elite sporting population. There seems to be little difference in recovery outcome between CWT and other popular recovery interventions such as cold water immersion and active recovery.

In a review on immersion therapy in general, Ian Wilcock, John Cronin, and Wayne Hing suggest that most of the benefits of contrast therapy are from the hydrostatic pressure from the water, not the variations in temperature.

A systematic review assessed the effectiveness of using contrast baths as a physical therapy modality to treat physical and functional related issues. The study found a weak correlation among the studied evidence to support the use of contrast bath therapy. Contrast baths may increase superficial skin blood flow and temperature, prior studies have found inconsistent correlations between edema and movement. There is no clear relationship between physiological changes and practical daily benefits.

== See also ==
- Ice bath
