= TK cell therapy =

Experimental leukemia treatment

TK is an experimental cell therapy which may be used to treat high-risk leukemia. It is currently undergoing a Phase III clinical trial to determine efficacy and clinical usefulness.

TK is currently being investigated in patients with acute leukemia in first or subsequent complete remission and at high risk of relapse or in patients with relapsed disease who are candidates for haploidentical transplantation of hemopoietic stem cells (taken from a partially HLA-compatible family donor).

== Research ==
TK is a cellular therapy based on the genetical engineering of donor T lymphocytes in order to express a suicide gene (thymidine kinase of the Herpes simplex virus, namely TK).

Once the lymphocytes donated by partially compatible family donors (haplo-transplant) have been genetically modified, they can be infused in patients in need of hematopoietic cell transplantation. The infusion of lymphocytes expressing the TK suicide gene, has the aim to prevent or treat leukemic relapse and promote immune reconstitution, necessary to protect patients from infections that often limit transplant efficacy.

The presence of TK allows for retention of immune protection and anti-leukaemic effects of donor T lymphocytes and at the same time to control and annul possible harmful reactions between these lymphocytes and healthy tissues of the patient, reaction known as graft-versus-host disease.

Activation of the cell suicide system is obtained by the administration of ganciglovir, an antiviral drug, which only leads to the death of cells expressing TK in patients with graft-versus-host disease. TK has been granted Orphan Drug designation both in the EU and the United States.
