= Speleotherapy =

Form of alternative respiratory therapy

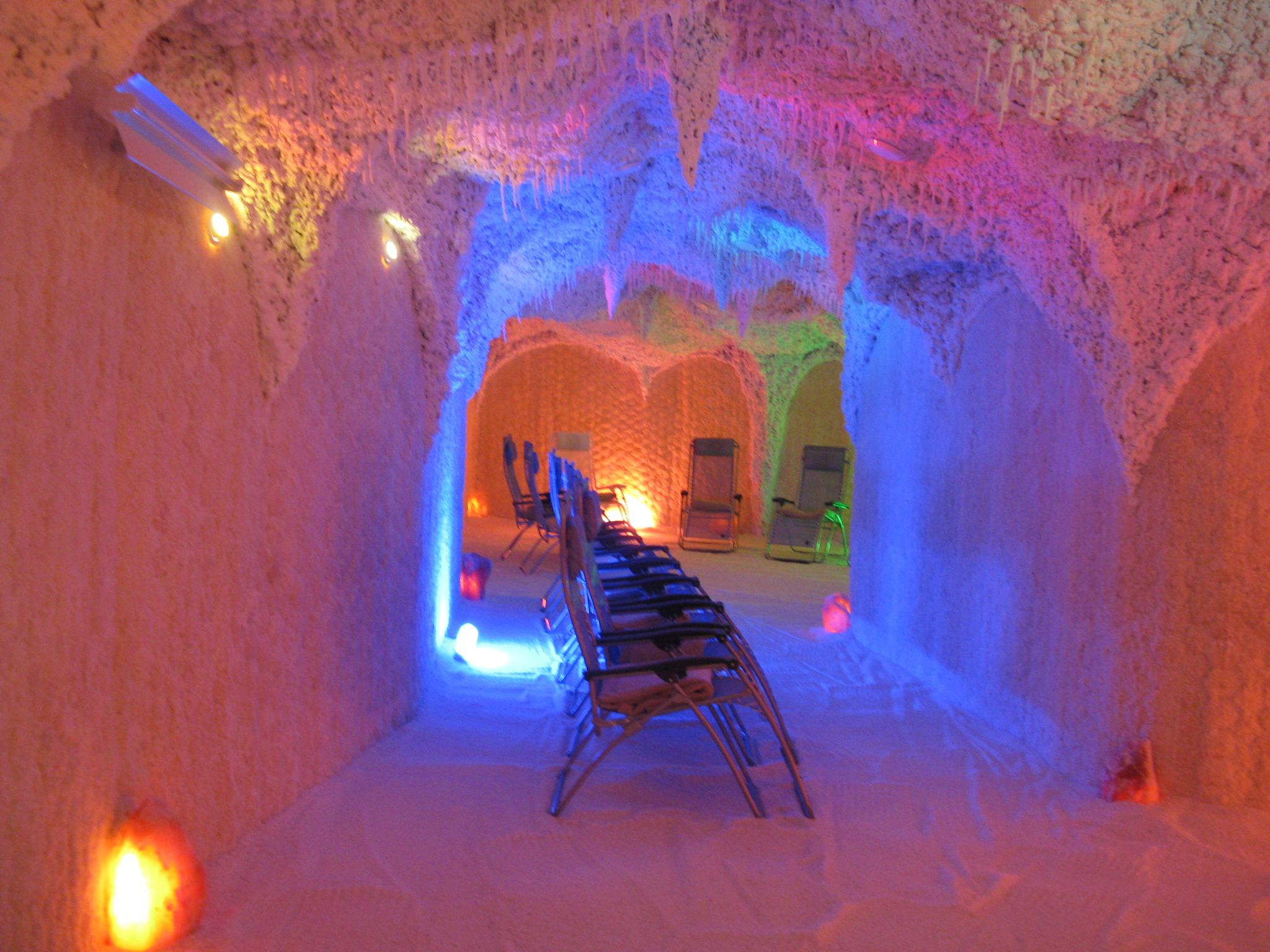
- Speleotherapy in Bad Soden-Salmünster, Germany
- MeSH: D055161

Speleotherapy (Greek σπήλαιον spḗlaion "cave") is an alternative medicine respiratory therapy involving breathing inside subterranean environments, such as a cave.

== History ==
Some sources claim that Hippocrates believed that salt-based therapies, including inhaling steam from saltwater, provided relief of respiratory symptoms. There are claims of improvements in the breathing of miners in Roman times and medieval times. Speleotherapy hospitals existed in Italy in the 19th century. In the middle of the 19th century, a clinic, founded in Mammoth Cave (Kentucky, USA), was intended for tuberculosis patients. However, a few months after the death of five of the patients, the hospital was closed.

The history of modern speleotherapy dates back to the 1950s. At this time, speleotherapeutic hospitals arose in several Eastern and Central European countries.

Residents of Ennepetal in Germany used the Kluterthöhle cave as a bomb shelter during WW2. Karl Hermann Spannagel began researching the therapeutic effect of caves.

Speleotherapeutic facilities in karst caves were started in Hungary and Czechoslovakia.

In 1968, in Solotvyn (now in Ukraine), the first speleotherapy clinic was opened on the territory of the USSR. In 1982, a climate chamber was patented, equipped with a salt filter-saturator to recreate the conditions of salt mines on the earth's surface.

== Indications ==
The treatment is claimed to be beneficial for bronchial asthma, bronchitis, allergic and chronic runny nose, allergic and chronic sinus diseases, various allergies and skin diseases, fibrosing alveolitis and croup. However, as of 2001, the evidence is inconclusive to support these claims.

== Speleotherapy in the Czech Republic ==
The first speleotherapy in the Czechoslovakia was carried out by Mgr. Štefan Roda in Slovakia in the Tombašek Cave in the High Tatras (1969). In 1973–1976, doctors Timová and Valtrová from the Children's Clinic in Banská Bystrica treated childhood asthmatics with speleotherapy with favourable results, which were published in the medical literature. From 1981 to 1985, speleotherapy became the subject of official scientific research tasks, carried out under the responsibility of the Ministry of Health and the Geographical Institute of the Czechoslovak Academy of Sciences. In 1985, speleotherapy was recognized as an official climatic treatment method.

According to the chairman of the International Union of Speleology's Standing Commission on Speleotherapy, Prof. Svetozar Dluholucky, M.D., speleotherapy is "a natural way of treating asthma and allergies, which it would be a sin not to use." He has conducted research in Bystrianska Cave since 1974, according to which there has been a fivefold decrease in respiratory diseases and asthma in the children studied. In 1997, he conducted further research on 111 asthmatic children with the same results. Allergists and immunologists remain sceptical, however.

There are two speleotherapy centres in the Czech Republic: the Children's Treatment Centre in Ostrov u Macochy and the Children's Treatment Centre for Respiratory Diseases in Zlaté Hory. The children's sanatorium in Mladč-Vojtěchov was closed in 2014.

== Research ==
Hoyrmír Malota led a research team that tested patients of the speleotherapeutic sanatorium in Mladeč in 1985–1987 and came to the clinically verified conclusion "that individual factors of the underground environment, or their complex connected by internal and external interactions, stimulate and modulate the immune system of the human organism directly. He confirmed that repeated exposure to the underground environment - without the use of anti-asthmatic, antihistamine, or immunomodulatory pharmaceutical preparations - induces positive and measurable changes in secretory and lymphatic lysosomes and immunoglobins after only a few days of exposure to the degree that any existing artificial immunomodulators cannot achieve."

Some factors characterizing cave endoclimates are controversial. While cave aerosols may theoretically contain high Ca and Mg ions, in practice, they are not present in the treatment sites known to date; Ca and Mg concentrations are everywhere the same as in the ambient air. It has been shown that the concentrations of Ca and Mg in cave air are not so significantly elevated as to be considered a therapeutic factor. The elevated CO_{2} concentration, or the absence of allergens in the cave (the presence of some molds in very small amounts), or the absence of ozone is also questionable.

According to the Cochrane Collaboration, three studies involving 124 children with asthma met the inclusion criteria for the 2001 meta-study. Still, only one study was of adequate methodological quality. Two studies reported that speleotherapy had a beneficial short-term effect on lung function. The other results could not be reliably evaluated. Due to the small number of studies, no reliable conclusion can be drawn from the available evidence on whether speleotherapy interventions are effective in treating chronic asthma. Randomized controlled trials with long-term follow-up are needed. No evidence of the effectiveness of speleotherapy was found from randomized controlled trials and further research is needed.

According to a 2017 Romanian systematic review, speleotherapy is a valuable treatment method for asthma and other respiratory problems. Still, only a few studies can be found in international databases, reflecting the specificity of this field. On the other hand, basic studies in laboratory animals and in vitro cell cultures have demonstrated the efficacy and usefulness of speleotherapy.
