= Duct tape occlusion therapy =

Method of treating warts

Duct tape occlusion therapy (DTOT) is a method of treating warts by covering them with duct tape for prolonged periods.

The manner in which duct tape appears to work is unclear. The tape might create a macerating and keratolytic environment, stimulating an immune response. The type of adhesive in the duct tape is likely to be important as leeching of the adhesive into the skin may be causing the immune system response. Side effects can include skin irritation and peeling.

There is mixed evidence that occlusive treatment with various types of duct tape is effective. Clinical trials in 2012 concluded that no statistically significant difference between clear duct tape and placebo could be determined within the sample. No such trial was conducted for the more-common, grey duct tape, which uses a different type of adhesive. On health information websites, duct tape is referred to as a treatment with mixed evidence of efficacy, no good evidence or described as alternative medicine.

Despite the mixed evidence for efficacy, the simplicity of the method and its limited side-effects leads some researchers to be reluctant to dismiss it.

== Evidence ==
In 1978, Jerome Z Litt was the first to suggest that adhesive tape could be used to treat warts on the fingers. He claimed: "My method is safe, easy, simple, painless, inexpensive, and highly effective. It leaves no scarring or deformed nails. The mystery remains: How and why does this method work? I cannot offer any reasonable or logical explanation. It cannot be all 'hypnotic' or 'suggestive.' Could it be that the airtight occlusion and a chemical reaction set up by the adhesive in the tape might combine to release a chemical or 'toxin' causing the formation of antibodies? Whatever it may be, it works. I recommend that you try it."

A 2002 study involved 51 individuals (aged 3–22) treated with either "standard duct tape" (not otherwise specified in the study) or cryotherapy. A piece of duct tape was cut as close to the size of the wart as possible, and applied to the area. The tape was left on for 6 days and replaced with new duct tape if it fell off. After 6 days, the tape was removed, the area soaked in water, and the wart debrided with an emery board or pumice stone. The tape was left off overnight and reapplied on the following morning. This process continued for up to 2 months or until the wart was resolved, whichever occurred first. Progress was monitored every 4 weeks. The researchers found the duct tape treatment significantly more effective than the cryotherapy (P=0.05) with 85% in the duct tape treatment group having a complete resolution of their wart, compared to 60% in the cryotherapy group. The study was criticized due to lack of a placebo control group, and because a number of outcome assessments were done by phone. There was also no reported long term follow up to ensure no recurrence of the warts.

Two later studies failed to repeat the results of the 2002 study. One compared duct tape with moleskin, finding no statistically significant difference in results reported between the two groups. Both studies used 3M clear duct tape, again concluding no statistically significant effect on wart resolution. The statistical power of the latter trial has been questioned, and it has been suggested that duct tape occlusion therapy only works with rubber-based adhesives, whereas these studies utilized acrylic-based adhesive.
