= Wake therapy =

Specific application of intentional sleep deprivation

Wake therapy (sometimes sleep deprivation therapy) is a specific application of intentional sleep deprivation. It encompasses many sleep-restricting paradigms that aim to address mood disorders with a form of non-pharmacological therapy.

== Description ==
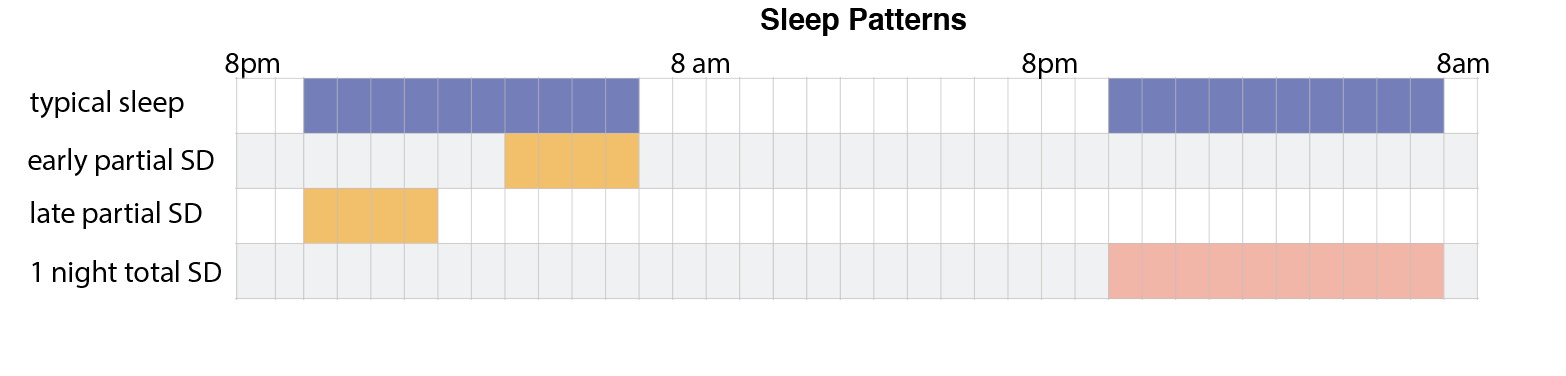
Example of sleep patterns: Top row depicts a typical sleep pattern (9 h), middle two rows show 1 day of early and late partial sleep deprivation (4 h) and bottom row shows 1 day of total sleep deprivation (0 h night 1). Each box represents 1 hour. Boxes without color indicate periods of wakefulness.

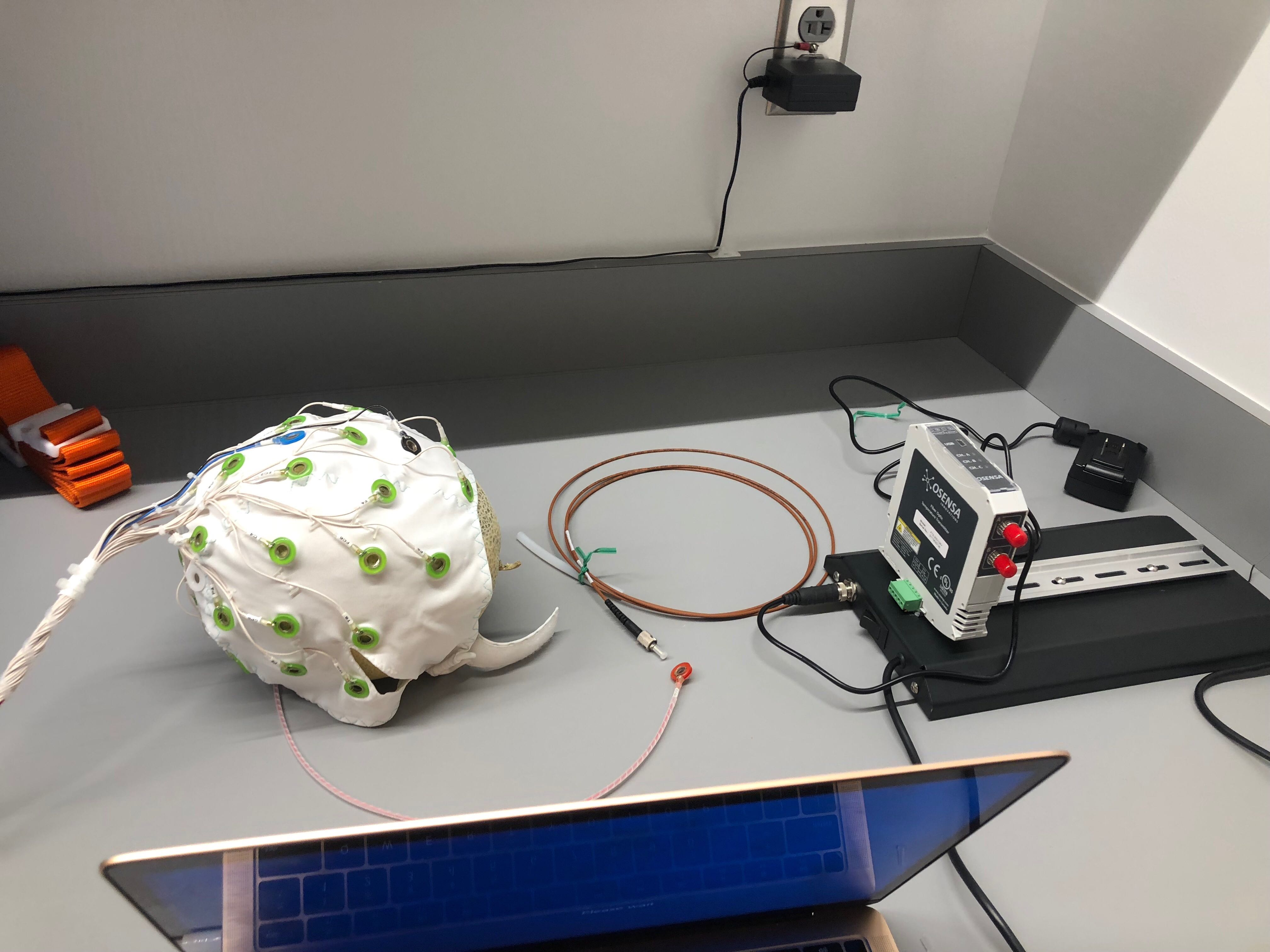
Electroencephalography cap.' A 64 channel EEG cap is shown here on a cantaloupe as a model. This type of cap is used to measure scalp electrical signal during many EEG studies of sleep.

Wake therapy was first popularized in 1966 and 1971 following articles by Schulte and by Pflug and Tölle describing striking symptom relief in depressed individuals after 1 night of total sleep deprivation. Wake therapy can involve partial sleep deprivation, which usually consists of restricting sleep to 4–6 hours, or total sleep deprivation, in which an individual stays up for more than 24 consecutive hours. During total sleep deprivation, an individual typically stays up about 36 hours, spanning a normal awakening time until the evening after the deprivation. It can also involve shifting the sleep schedule to be later or earlier than a typical schedule (e.g. going to bed at 5 am), which is called Sleep Phase Advancement. Older studies involved the repetition of sleep deprivation in the treatment of depression, either until the person showed a response to the treatment or until the person had reached a threshold for the possible number of sleep deprivation treatments.

Chronic sleep deprivation is dangerous and in modern research studies it is no longer common to repeat sleep deprivation treatments close together in time.

Recent closed-loop paradigms have been developed to selectively deprive individuals of some stages—but not others—of sleep. During slow-wave sleep deprivation, researchers monitor the electrical activity on an individual's scalp with electroencephalography (EEG) in real-time. Then, sensory stimulation, like a burst of pink noise, is used to disrupt certain stages of sleep (i.e. by interfering with slow waves during non-rapid eye movement sleep). The goal of these paradigms is to investigate how the deprivation of one type of sleep stage, or sleep microarchitecture, affects outcome measures, as opposed to the deprivation of all sleep stages. One drawback of closed loop sleep deprivation paradigms is that they must be carefully calibrated for each individual. If researchers use auditory stimuli to inhibit slow waves, they must calibrate the volume of the stimulus so that it is loud enough to evoke a sensory response, but quiet enough that it does not wake the patient from sleep. There is some evidence that depriving individuals of slow wave sleep can induce a rapid antidepressant effect in a dose-dependent manner, meaning a greater reduction in slow wave activity relative to baseline is expected to induce greater symptom relief.

== Response rate ==
The response rate to sleep deprivation is generally agreed to be approximately 40-60%. A 2017 meta-analysis of 66 sleep studies with partial or total sleep deprivation in the treatment of depression found that the overall response rate (immediate relief of symptoms) to total sleep deprivation was 50.4% of individuals, and the response rate to partial sleep deprivation was 53.1% In 2009, a separate review on sleep deprivation found that 1700 patients with depression across 75 separate studies showed a response rate that ranged from 40 – 60%. For reference, the non-response rate for conventional antidepressant pharmacotherapy is estimated to be ~30%, but symptom relief may be delayed by several weeks after the onset of treatment (compared to the immediate, transient relief induced by sleep deprivation). Metrics of mood change vary highly across studies, including surveys of daily mood, or clinician administered interviews that assess the severity of depression symptoms. One benefit to sleep deprivation is that it can provide relief from symptoms within 6–12 hours after sleep deprivation, a rapid effect compared to the 4–6 weeks that it may take conventional treatments to have an effect.

One downside of sleep deprivation therapy is that the beneficial effects are transient, and disappear after even short periods of sleep. Even ultra-short periods of sleep lasting seconds, termed microsleeps, have been shown to cause a relapse in symptoms.

=== Relapse after recovery sleep ===
One meta-analysis of over 1700 unmedicated depressed patients who had undergone sleep deprivation found that 83% relapsed in their symptoms after one night of recovery sleep. Only 5-10 % of patients who initially respond to sleep deprivation show sustained remission. However, when sleep deprivation is combined with pharmacological treatments, the number of patients who show sustained remission is much higher, with rates as high as half of patients experiencing sustained remission. Compared to a relapse rate of 83% for unmedicated patients, patients who simultaneously took antidepressants only experienced a relapse rate of 59% after a night of recovery sleep.

=== Effect of sleep deprivation depends on psychiatric status ===
The effect of sleep deprivation on mood is dependent on an individual's psychiatric status. Healthy individuals with no history of mood disorders who undergo sleep deprivation often show no change or a worsening of mood after the sleep deprivation. In addition to constant or worsening mood, they also show an increase in tiredness, agitation, and restlessness. Similarly, individuals with psychiatric disorders such as obsessive compulsive disorder or those who suffer from panic attacks do not show reliable improvements in mood disorder.

Types of Sleep Deprivation
Type	Average Response Rate*	Average Response Duration
Partial sleep deprivation (~ 4–6 hours of sleep in either the first or last half of the night)	~ 53.1%	~ 1 Day
Total sleep deprivation (no sleep 24–46 hours)	~40-60 %	~ 1 Day

Scales Used to Assess Mood Improvements
Scale Name	Date Published	Summary	Inter-rater reliability	Time to complete	Typical reduction rate required for "remission"
Hamilton Depression Rating Scale	1960	21 items	0.46 to 0.97	15–20 minutes	30 – 40% reduction in baseline score, or a score <7
Montgomery Asberg Depression Rating Scale	1978	10 items: 9 based on patient report, 1 rater's observation	0.89-0.97	15–20 minutes	score < 5

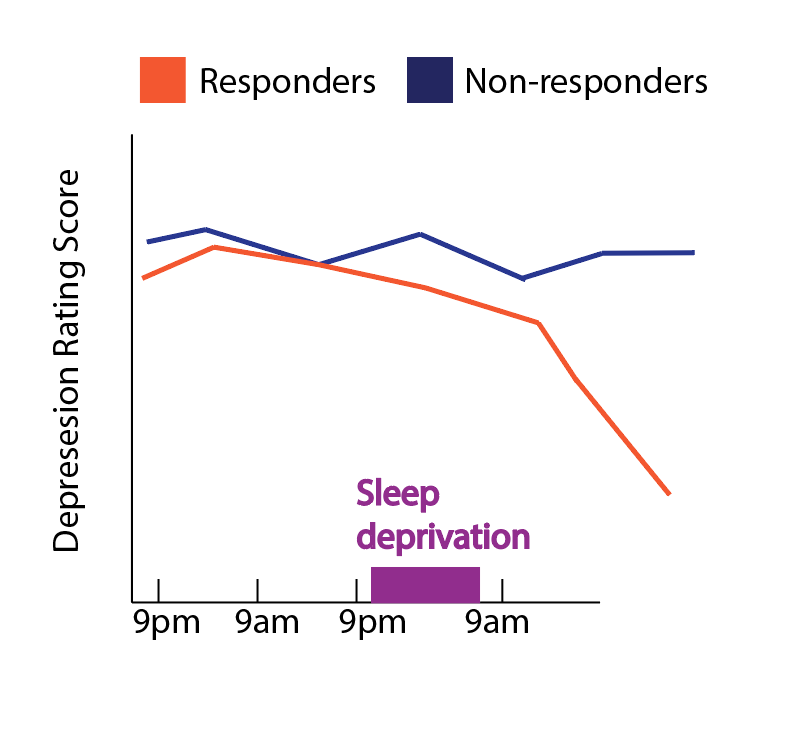
Example timecourse of depression rating scores across a night of sleep deprivation: Responders (orange) to sleep deprivation show lower depression scores (and higher positive mood scores) after sleep deprivation. Nonresponders (blue) do not show a significant change in mood scores.

== Side effects ==
The only known contraindication to sleep deprivation therapy for individuals with unipolar depression is a risk of seizures. Some studies have shown that the stress associated with a night of sleep deprivation can precipitate unexpected medical conditions, such as a heart attack. Other known side effects of sleep deprivation include general fatigue, and headaches. For individuals with bipolar depression, sleep deprivation can sometimes cause a switch into a manic state.

=== Associated neurological injuries ===
Studies show that increase in BDNF is adaptative to neuronal injury and that after 3 hours of sleep loss per night it becomes maladaptative and apoptosis occurs. Studies in mices shows neuronal deaths occurring only after 2 days of REM sleep deprivation. However, mice does not models well effects in humans because they sleep a third of the amount of REM sleep as humans do and caspase-3, which can be used as a proxy for neuron apoptosis, kills 3 times the amount in humans than in mice. Something also not accounted in nearly all of the studies is that acute REM sleep deprivation induces lasting (> 20 days) neuronal apoptosis in mice.

Such histological studies cannot be performed on humans for ethical reasons, but long-term studies study shows that sleep quality is more associated to grey matter volume reduction than age. Alternatives must be preferably considered because unlike many psychiatric conditions, neuronal losses and its effects are life-long lasting and cannot be treated currently.

== Combination of antidepressant pharmacological intervention and total sleep deprivation ==
=== Unipolar depression ===
Although individual studies have shown a positive effect of combined antidepressant-sleep deprivation therapy, there is currently no widely accepted consensus about whether combined treatment is superior to pharmacological intervention alone for individuals with unipolar depression. A meta analysis (2020) of more than 368 patients found that sleep deprivation combined with standard treatment did not reduce depressive symptoms compared to standard treatment alone.

=== Bipolar depression ===
In contrast with unipolar depression, there is a wide body of evidence that sleep deprivation may be useful in the treatment of bipolar depression. A meta analysis of 90 articles found that combining total sleep deprivation and pharmacological intervention significantly increased the antidepressant effects in patient with bipolar depression when compared to pharmacological intervention alone. The metric that the studies used to assess success of the interventions was a depression symptom scale called the Montgomery-Asberg Depression Scale or the Hamilton Depression Rating Scale, which both are used to measure someone's mood. Multiple studies have shown that adding a mood stabilizing medication (lithium, amineptine, or pindolol) to total sleep deprivation can induce a significant decrease in depression symptoms that is sustained at least 10 days after the treatment. When considering the long-term effects of the combined total sleep deprivation-pharmacological intervention, it appears that combination therapy can also improve the maintenance of the antidepressant effect for individuals with bipolar mood disorders. These results suggest that adding total sleep deprivation to bipolar depression pharmacological treatment may result in an augmented treatment response.

Total sleep deprivation may not be necessary to achieve the beneficial effect of combined sleep deprivation-antidepressant therapy- partial sleep deprivation may be sufficient. Compliance in these studies is typically measured with actigraphy in order to track movements and time in bed.

=== Mechanism ===
The mechanism by which sleep deprivation enhances the effect of antidepressant pharmacological intervention is still under investigation. One hypothesis is that sleep deprivation could enhance the effects of the antidepressant drugs, or it could shorten the delay of the drugs effects, which can take up to several months depending on the drug.

=== BDNF hypothesis ===
One hypothesis for the mechanism of sleep deprivation is that it induces a rapid increase in the level of a neutrophic protein called brain-derived neurotrophic factor (BDNF), which mimics the long term effects of some antidepressant drugs. Drug-naive patients with depression typically show lower levels of BDNF than age and sex-matched controls. An increase in BDNF in patients with depression who take a class of drugs called selective serotonin reuptake inhibitors has been reported in several studies to increase after 8 weeks. Similarly, an increase in serum BDNF level is also observed in patients who undergo a single night of total or REM sleep deprivation, however the effect is observed immediately rather than after a long period of time. This increase is hypothesized to be the result of a compensatory mechanism in the brain that produces BDNF to preserve cognitive functions like working memory and attention.

=== Serotonin hypothesis ===
Another hypothesis for the mechanism of sleep deprivation is that it may affect the serotonergic system, including a receptor called the 5-HT1A receptor. Animals models of sleep deprivation suggest that sleep deprivation increases serotonin neurotransmission in several ways, including 1) increasing extracellular serotonin, 2) increasing serotonin turnover, 3) reducing the sensitivity of serotonin inhibitory autoreceptors and 4) increasing behavioral responsiveness to serotonin precursors. Studies in humans that measure pre-sleep deprivation levels of serotonin with single photon emission computer tomography have provided evidence that responders to sleep deprivation may have a specific deficit in serotonergic systems.

== Barriers to sleep deprivation-antidepressant combination therapy research ==
One barrier to understanding the effects of sleep deprivation is the lack of a consistent metric of "response". Although there are standard mood surveys and clinician-rated scales, different investigators use different criterion as evidence of response to the treatment. For example, some investigators have required a 30% decrease in the Hamilton Rating Scale, while others required a 50% decrease.

Other barriers include the fact that researchers are not blind to patient condition when they rate the patient's mood, and that many previous studies have not included control groups, but rather only published findings on patient groups without any control reference.

Skeptics of sleep deprivation therapy argue that it is not the sleep deprivation itself, but rather the prolonged contact with other humans and unusual circumstances of the sleep deprivation that lead to improvements in mood symptoms.

Another major barrier is that depression is a highly heterogenous disorder, spanning both unipolar and bipolar types.

== Predictors of antidepressant response to sleep deprivation therapy ==
=== Diurnal mood ===
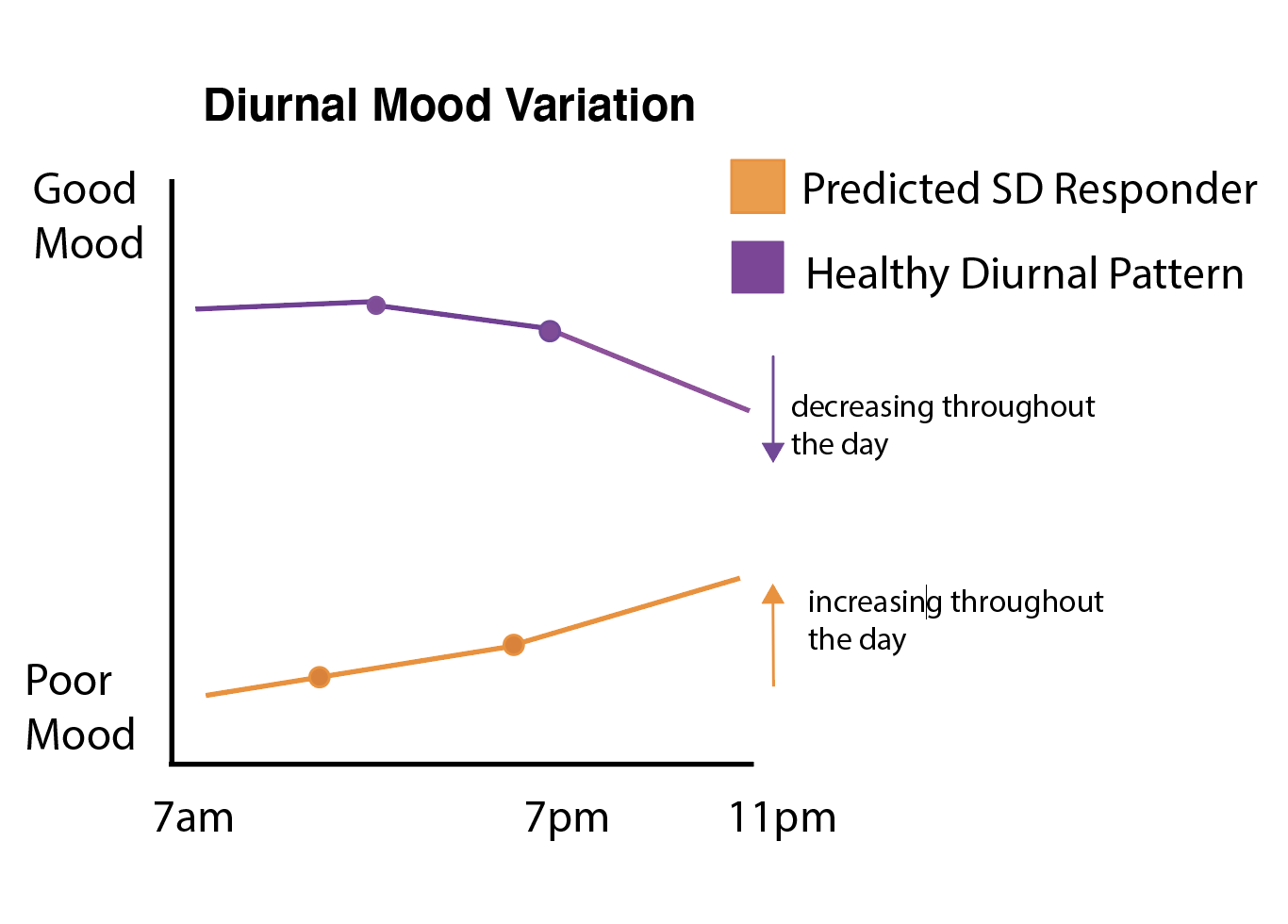
Changes in mood across 1 day. Healthy individuals will typically show the highest mood after awakening in the morning, with a gradual degradation throughout the day. In contrast, individuals with depression show low mood scores in the morning, that gradually increase throughout the day. These trends are based on group averages; many individuals deviate from these trajectories.

Mood fluctuations are currently thought to be dependent on circadian processes. A typical healthy individual without a mood disorder shows circadian-locked fluctuations in mood, with positive mood beginning right after the morning awakening, and decaying as the day goes on during prolonged wakefulness. A typical individual with depression will show the opposite mood fluctuation cycle, with a low mood right after morning awakening, which gradually becomes more positive with prolonged wakefulness. These circadian-locked changes across the day are referred to as "diurnal" variations in mood. Evidence across many sleep deprivation studies suggests that an individual's diurnal mood fluctuations can be used to predict whether they will respond to sleep deprivation therapy. Individuals with depression who show the typical low morning mood that increases throughout the day are more likely to respond positively to sleep deprivation than individuals who show mood fluctuations that deviate from the typical pattern. One caveat to these findings is that a single individual may show diurnal fluctuations that vary day-to-day, showing typical diurnal changes on one day while not showing any changes (constant mood) on the next. This complexity was addressed in studies that followed single individuals and administered repeated sleep deprivation on days when the individual showed different mood fluctuations. The studies showed that an individual's ability to show the typical mood fluctuations was a better predictor of whether they would respond to sleep deprivation treatment than the individual's mood state on the particular day that they underwent sleep deprivation.

=== Short REM latency ===
Responsiveness to sleep deprivation is also currently believed to be dependent on observable pattern in a person's regular sleep cycle, such as how quickly a person enters into a sleep cycle called rapid eye movement (REM) sleep. Individuals with depression typically show abnormally short REM sleep onsets, meaning they enter into the REM sleep stage earlier in the course of the night than matched healthy controls. Individuals with depression who have short-latency REM sleep typically respond to sleep deprivation therapy more often than individuals with depression who do not show the typical short latency REM sleep pattern.

== See also ==
- Cognitive behavioral therapy for insomnia

== Sources ==
- Kragh, M.; Martiny, K.; Videbech, P.; Møller, D. N.; Wihlborg, C. S.; Lindhardt, T.; Larsen, E. R. (December 2017). "Wake and light therapy for moderate-to-severe depression - a randomized controlled trial". Acta Psychiatrica Scandinavica. 136 (6): 559–570. doi:10.1111/acps.12741. PMID 28422269. S2CID 46869059.
- Boland et al. 2019, "Meta-Analysis of the Antidepressant Effects of Acute Sleep Deprivation"
