= Fast neutron therapy =

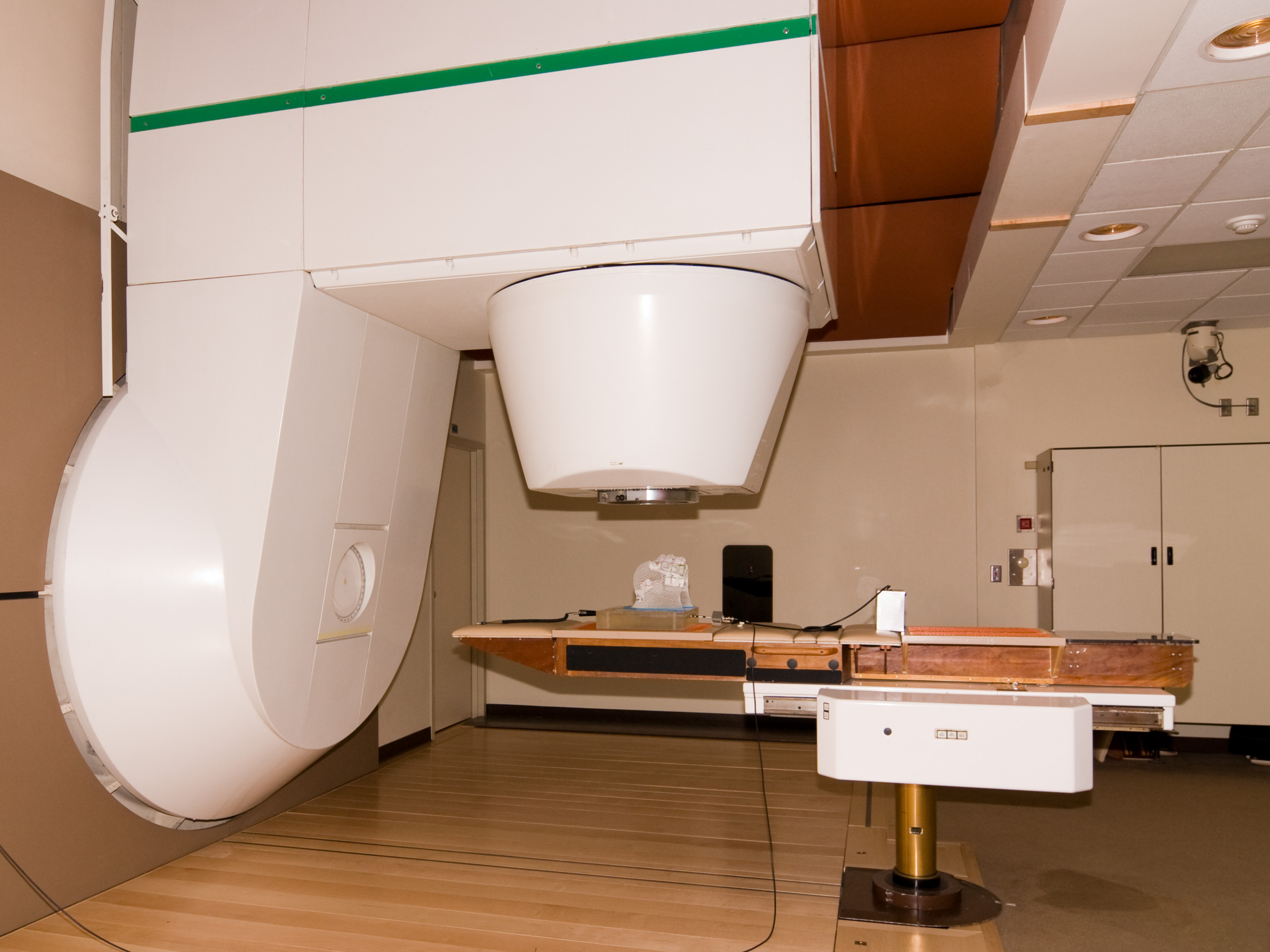
- Patient treating room for neutron radiation therapy
- Specialty: Oncology
- ICD-10-PCS: D?0?5ZZ
- ICD-9: 92.26

Fast neutron therapy utilizes high energy neutrons typically between 50 and 70 MeV to treat cancer. Most fast neutron therapy beams are produced by reactors, cyclotrons (d+Be) and linear accelerators. Neutron therapy is currently available in Germany, Russia, South Africa and the United States. In the United States, one treatment center is operational, in Seattle, Washington. The Seattle center uses a cyclotron which produces a proton beam impinging upon a beryllium target.

== Advantages ==
Radiation therapy kills cancer cells in two ways depending on the effective energy of the radiative source. The amount of energy deposited as the particles traverse a section of tissue is referred to as the linear energy transfer (LET). X-rays produce low LET radiation, and protons and neutrons produce high LET radiation. Low LET radiation damages cells predominantly through the generation of reactive oxygen species (free radicals). The neutron is uncharged and damages cells by direct effect on nuclear structures. Malignant tumors tend to have low oxygen levels and thus can be resistant to low LET radiation. This gives an advantage to neutrons in certain situations. One advantage is a generally shorter treatment cycle. To kill the same number of cancerous cells, neutrons require one third the effective dose as protons. Another advantage is the established ability of neutrons to better treat some cancers, such as salivary gland, adenoid cystic carcinomas and certain types of brain tumors, especially high-grade gliomas

=== LET ===
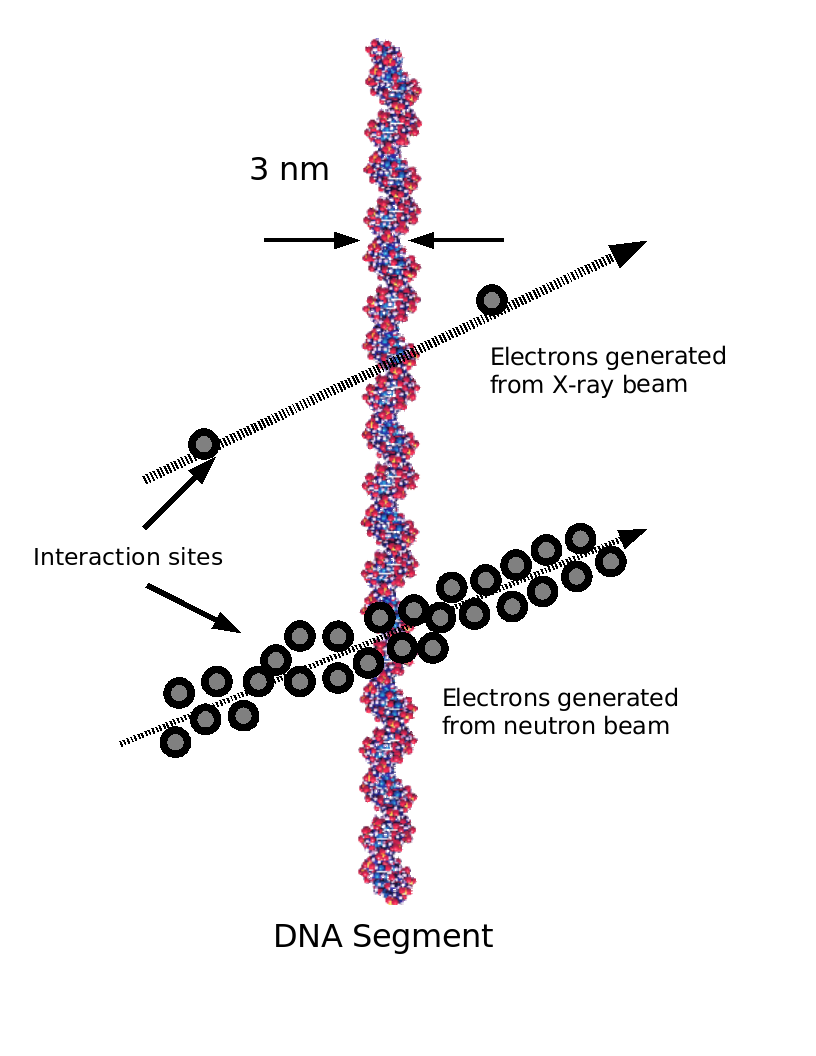
Comparison of Low LET electrons and High LET electrons

When therapeutic energy X-rays (1 to 25 MeV) interact with cells in human tissue, they do so mainly by Compton interactions, and produce relatively high energy secondary electrons. These high energy electrons deposit their energy at about 1 keV/μm. By comparison, the charged particles produced at a site of a neutron interaction may deliver their energy at a rate of 30–80 keV/μm. The amount of energy deposited as the particles traverse a section of tissue is referred to as the linear energy transfer (LET). X-rays produce low LET radiation, and neutrons produce high LET radiation.

Because the electrons produced from X-rays have high energy and low LET, when they interact with a cell typically only a few ionizations will occur. It is likely then that the low LET radiation will cause only single strand breaks of the DNA helix. Single strand breaks of DNA molecules can be readily repaired, and so the effect on the target cell is not necessarily lethal. By contrast, the high LET charged particles produced from neutron irradiation cause many ionizations as they traverse a cell, and so double-strand breaks of the DNA molecule are possible. DNA repair of double-strand breaks are much more difficult for a cell to repair, and more likely to lead to cell death.

DNA repair mechanisms are quite efficient, and during a cell's lifetime many thousands of single strand DNA breaks will be repaired. A sufficient dose of ionizing radiation, however, delivers so many DNA breaks that it overwhelms the capability of the cellular mechanisms to cope.

Heavy ion therapy (e.g. carbon ions) makes use of the similarly high LET of ^{12}C^{6+} ions.

Because of the high LET, the relative radiation damage (relative biological effect or RBE) of fast neutrons is 4 times that of X-rays, meaning 1 rad of fast neutrons is equal to 4 rads of X-rays. The RBE of neutrons is also energy dependent, so neutron beams produced with different energy spectra at different facilities will have different RBE values.

=== Oxygen effect ===
The presence of oxygen in a cell acts as a radiosensitizer, making the effects of the radiation more damaging. Tumor cells typically have a lower oxygen content than normal tissue. This medical condition is known as tumor hypoxia and therefore the oxygen effect acts to decrease the sensitivity of tumor tissue. The oxygen effect may be quantitatively described by the Oxygen Enhancement Ratio (OER). Generally it is believed that neutron irradiation overcomes the effect of tumor hypoxia, although there are counterarguments.

== Clinical uses ==
The efficacy of neutron beams for use on prostate cancer has been shown through randomized trials. Fast neutron therapy has been applied successfully against salivary gland tumors. Adenoid cystic carcinomas have also been treated. Various other head and neck tumors have been examined.

== Side effects ==
Side effects can depend on the specific procedure being performed. During treatment of some cancers of the head and neck, neutron damage to nearby areas such as the brain and sensory neurons may result in brain atrophy, or blindness. Some patients are more susceptible to such side effects than others. The patient must decide whether the advantages of a potentially lasting cure outweigh the risks of this treatment when faced with an otherwise incurable cancer.

== Fast neutron centers ==
Several centers around the world have used fast neutrons for treating cancer. Due to lack of funding and support, at present only one is active in the USA. The University of Washington and the Gershenson Radiation Oncology Center operate fast neutron therapy beams and both are equipped with a Multi-Leaf Collimator (MLC) to shape the neutron beam.

=== University of Washington ===
The Radiation Oncology Department operates a proton cyclotron that produces fast neutrons from directing 50.5 MeV protons onto a beryllium target. The UW Cyclotron is equipped with a gantry mounted delivery system an MLC to produce shaped fields. The UW Neutron system is referred to as the Clinical Neutron Therapy System (CNTS). The CNTS is typical of most neutron therapy systems. A large, well shielded building is required to cut down on radiation exposure to the general public and to house the necessary equipment.

Univ. of Washington CNTS
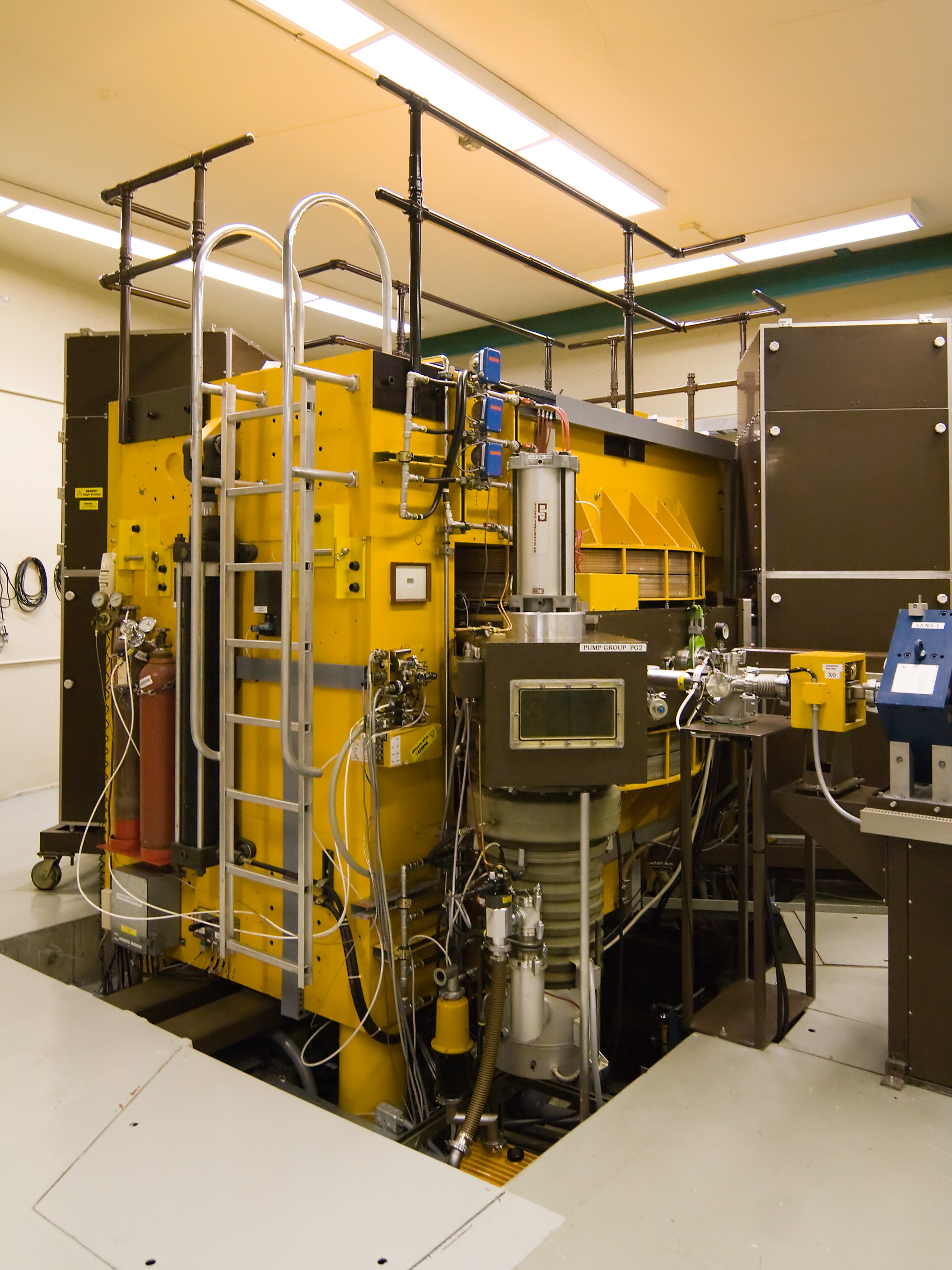
UW Cyclotron

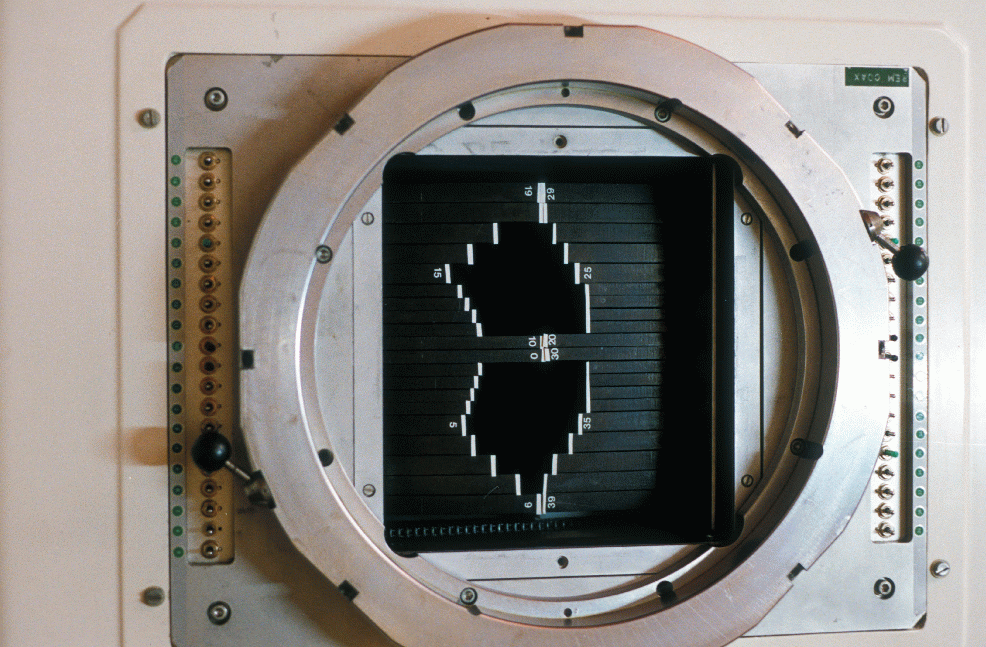
Multi-Leaf Collimator (MLC) used to shape the neutron beam

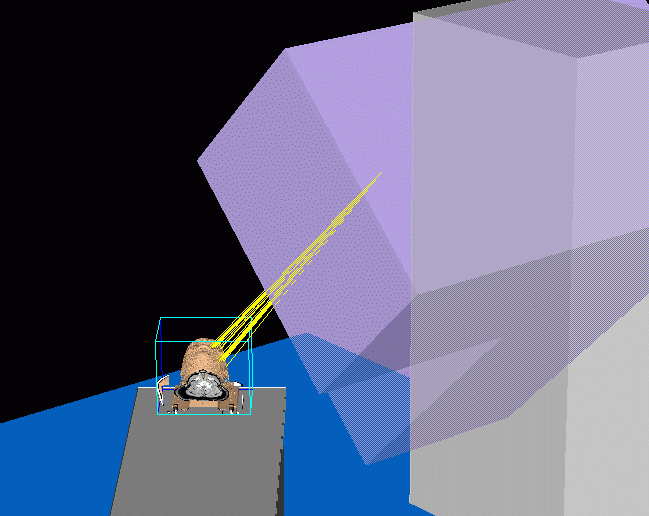
Schematic of a treatment field delivery. The patient couch has been rotated, along with the gantry so the neutron beam will enter obliquely, to give maximum sparing of normal tissue.

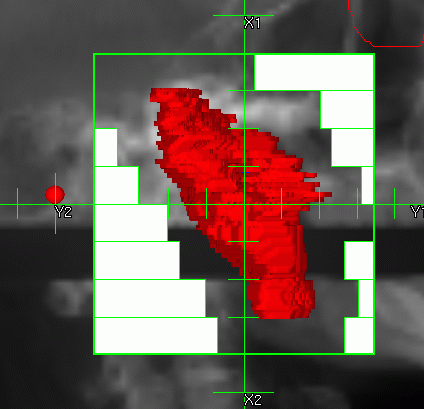
Example of a treatment neutron field collimated using a neutron MLC

A beamline transports the proton beam from the cyclotron to a gantry system. The gantry system contains magnets for deflecting and focusing the proton beam onto the beryllium target. The end of the gantry system is referred to as the head, and contains dosimetry systems to measure the dose, along with the MLC and other beam shaping devices. The advantage of having a beam transport and gantry are that the cyclotron can remain stationary, and the radiation source can be rotated around the patient. Along with varying the orientation of the treatment couch which the patient is positioned on, variation of the gantry position allows radiation to be directed from virtually any angle, allowing sparing of normal tissue and maximum radiation dose to the tumor.

During treatment, only the patient remains inside the treatment room (called a vault) and the therapists will remotely control the treatment, viewing the patient via video cameras. Each delivery of a set neutron beam geometry is referred to as a treatment field or beam. The treatment delivery is planned to deliver the radiation as effectively as possible, and usually results in fields that conform to the shape of the gross target, with any extension to cover microscopic disease.

=== Karmanos Cancer Center / Wayne State University ===
The neutron therapy facility at the Gershenson Radiation Oncology Center at Karmanos Cancer Center/Wayne State University (KCC/WSU) in Detroit bore some similarities to the CNTS at the University of Washington, but also had many unique characteristics. This unit was decommissioned in 2011.

MLC on KCC/WSU cyclotron
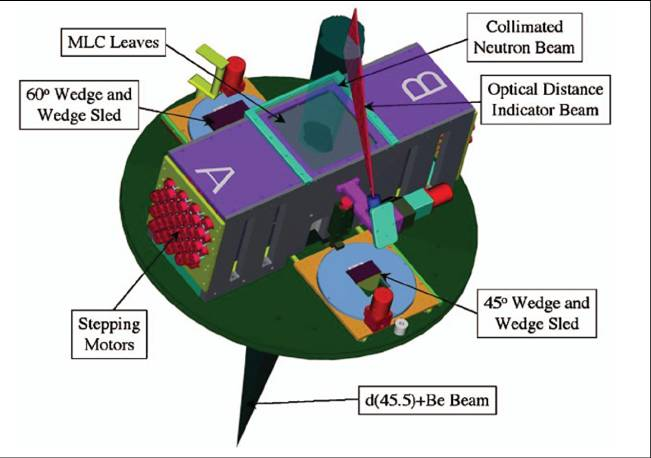
Schematic of MLC

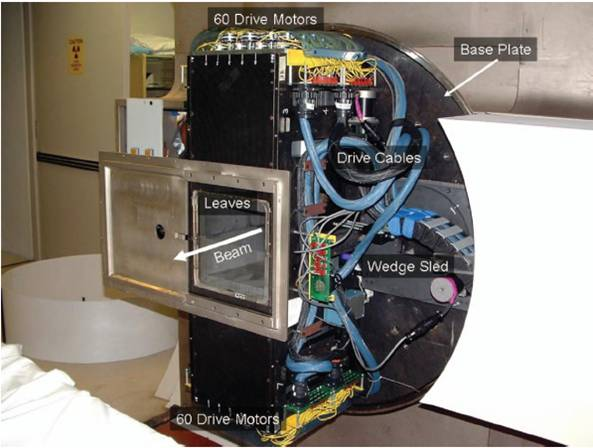
Photo of the MLC

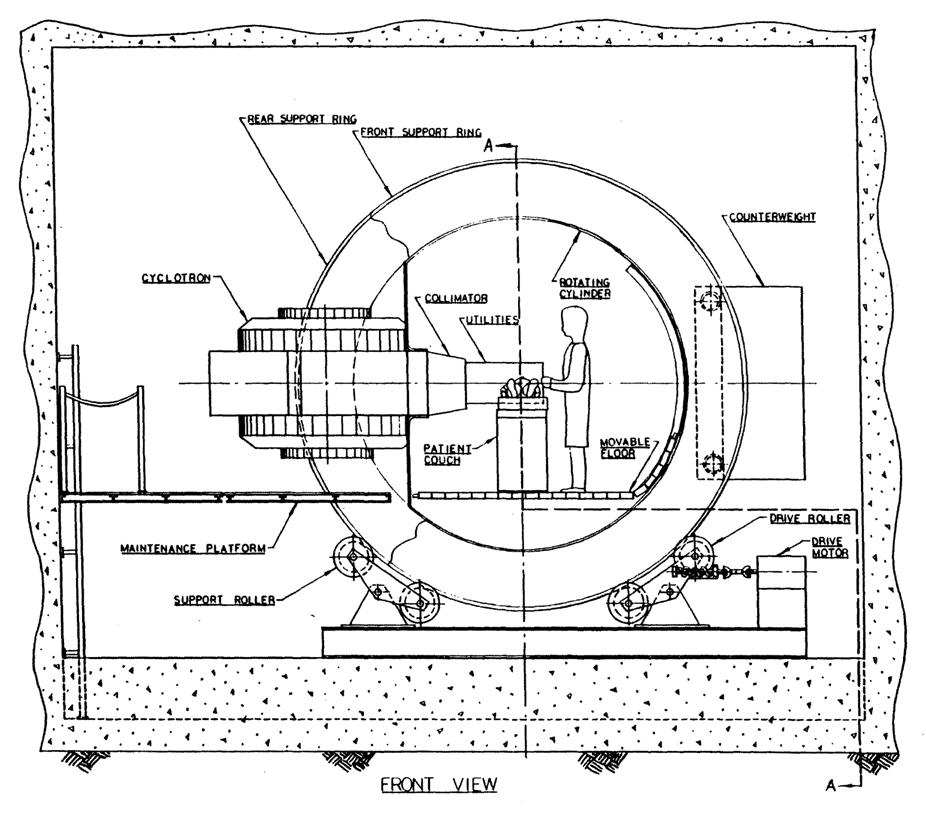
Schematic of the KCC/WSU gantry mounted superconducting cyclotron

While the CNTS accelerates protons, the KCC facility produced its neutron beam by accelerating 48.5 MeV deuterons onto a beryllium target. This method produces a neutron beam with depth dose characteristics roughly similar to those of a 4 MV photon beam. The deuterons were accelerated using a gantry mounted superconducting cyclotron (GMSCC), eliminating the need for extra beam steering magnets and allowing the neutron source to rotate a full 360° around the patient couch.

The KCC facility was also equipped with an MLC beam shaping device, the only other neutron therapy center in the USA besides the CNTS. The MLC at the KCC facility had been supplemented with treatment planning software that allows for the implementation of Intensity Modulated Neutron Radiotherapy (IMNRT), a recent advance in neutron beam therapy which allows for more radiation dose to the targeted tumor site than 3-D neutron therapy.

KCC/WSU has more experience than anyone in the world using neutron therapy for prostate cancer, having treated nearly 1,000 patients during the past 10 years.

=== Fermilab / Northern Illinois University ===
The Fermilab neutron therapy center first treated patients in 1976, and since that time has treated over 3,000 patients. In 2004, the Northern Illinois University began managing the center. The neutrons produced by the linear accelerator at Fermilab have the highest energies available in the US and among the highest in the world

The Fermilab center was decommissioned in 2013.

== See also ==
- Boron neutron capture therapy
