= Holmgren's wool test =

Test to detect colour blindness

Holmgren's colored wool test
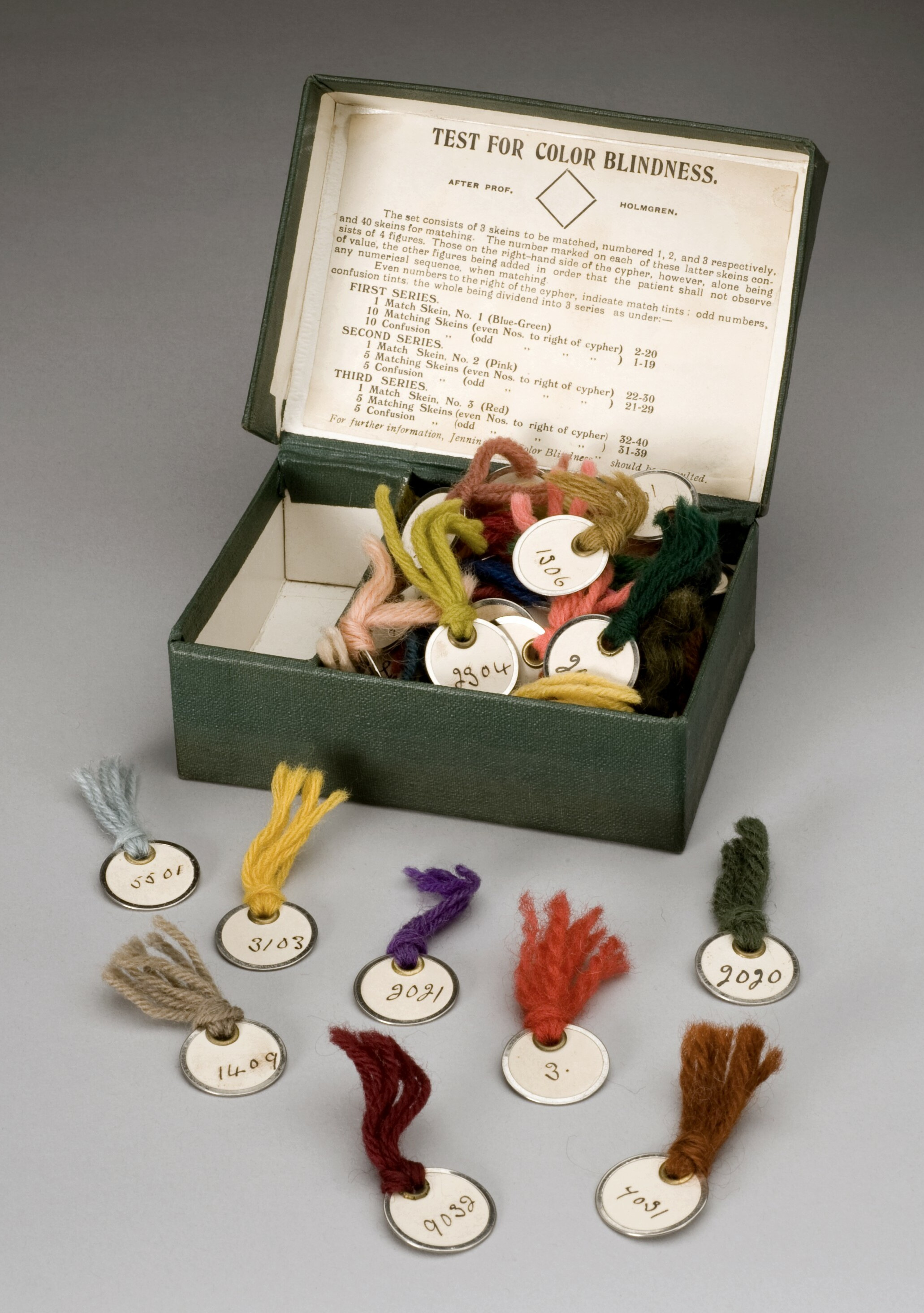
- Holmgren's colored wool test
- Specialty: Ophthalmology, optometry
- ICD-9-CM: 95.06
- MeSH: D003119

Holmgren's wool test also known as Holmgren's colored wool test is a color vision test used to detect color vision deficiency. Swedish physiologist Frithiof Holmgren introduced the test in 1874. It was the first successful attempt to standardize the detection of color blindness. William Thomson simplified the original Holmgren test, which was later named the Holmgren-Thomson test.

== History ==
Holmgren's colored wool test is a color vision test method introduced in 1874 by the Swedish physiologist Alarik Frithiof Holmgren (1831-1897). Holmgren studied the electrical response of the retina to light.

Holmgren's test gained attention following Lagerlunda rail accident in Sweden in 1875. Suspecting that the train's engineer (who had died in the accident) was color blind, Holmgren decided to examine the 266 employees of the Uppsala Gabole line, and as he suspected, thirteen of them were found to be color blind. Holmgren's test quickly established itself as a systematic and reliable method of detecting color blindness in railway and shipping workers. Following Holmgren's research, test was commissioned by the Swedish railway authority in 1875 and color blindness testing was made mandatory for railway and shipping workers in Sweden. The original Holmgren test was the first successful attempt to standardize the detection of color blindness.

Holmgren developed his test based on the Young–Helmholtz theory of color perception. The Holmgen test was designed to matching rather than naming colors. The actual test was more difficult.

Dr. William Thomson simplified the original Holmgren test. In 1879, the American government commissioned him to conduct a color-blind inspection for railroads and shipping. He worked to simplify Holmgren's method so that a "non-professional" test could be performed and the results could be forwarded to an expert for interpretation. Thompson reduced the number of matching colors and numbered each one. This is one of the earliest examples of a psychological test used on a large group. It was later named the Holmgren-Thomson test.

The British Board of Trade used Holmgren's wool test to test the color vision of seafarers from 1895 to 1913.

== Test ==
In Holmgren's wool test, the patient is asked to match coloured skeins of yarn to the samples in the box. At first, the patient is asked to select from the 40 skeins, 10 skeins that best match the light green master A. From the remaining 30 skeins, the patient is then asked to select the 5 skeins that best match the red master C. Lastly, the patient is asked to select 5 skeins from the remaining 25, to match the rose master B.

From the mistakes made, the doctor can diagnose the type of colour blindness. If the patient chooses blue or violet colors in the red matching test, it means that they have red blindness. If the patient choose gray or dark brown colors on the green color matching, it indicates that they may have a green blindness problem. If the subject prefers green or yellow colors in the violet color test, they are defective to violet.
