= List of people with color blindness =

This is a list of people with color blindness, meaning they have a decreased ability to see color or differences in color.

== A–Z ==
Name	Picture	Type/Details	Lifespan	Country	Profession	Notes	Source
Jacques Abeille			1942–2022	France	Surrealist writer	Wanted to be a painter.	
Nate Bargatze			b. 1979	United States	comedian	Had trouble reading cue cards while hosting Saturday Night Live.	
František Bílek			1872–1941	Czechia	Sculptor	Was forced in school to switch from painting to sculpting.	
Ian Botham			b. 1955	England	Cricketer		
Jack Buck		red–green	1924–2002	United States	Sportscaster	Prevented promotion in merchant navy.	
Taj Burrow		red–green	b. 1978	Australia	Surfer	Was prevented from becoming a pilot.	
Christopher Delamar Caldwell (Bob the Drag Queen)		red-green	b. 1986	United States	Drag queen, comedian, actor	Prefers black and white (such as houndstooth) and monochrome outfits.	
Sebastian Coe			b. 1956	England	Politician, retired athlete		
Walter Cronkite		red–green	1916–2009	United States	Journalist		
Roger Crouch			b. 1940	United States	NASA Astronaut	Payload specialist in two Space Shuttle missions in 1997.	
John Dalton		deuteranopia	1766–1844	England	Scientist	Could only recognize blue, purple and yellow. Pioneered research into colorblindness, which was originally named Daltonism after him. Specified in his will that an autopsy of his eyes be conducted.	
Russell T Davies			b. 1963	Wales	Screenwriter	Was dissuaded from a career as a comic artist.	
Grant Dayton		red–green	b. 1987	United States	Major League Baseball pitcher		
Thomas Delaney		red–green	b. 1991	Denmark	Association football player		
Jesse Draxler		red–green	b. 1983	United States	Visual artist	Since 2015, Draxler has worked exclusively in black and white.	
Milton H. Erickson			1901–1980	United States	Hypnotist		
Lara Flynn Boyle			b. 1970	United States	Actress	Had trouble reading cue cards while hosting Saturday Night Live.	
Brian Foster			b. 1972	United States	BMX rider	Foster once held a job painting bikes.	
Merrick Garland		red–green	b. 1952	United States	86th United States Attorney General	Kept a list of matching suits and ties.	
Bill Gates			b. 1955	United States	Founder of Microsoft		
Joseph Gatt			b. 1971	England	Actor, model	Was prevented from becoming a pilot.	
Jeff Gerstmann		red–green	b. 1975	United States	Video game journalist		
Oliver Goldsmith		blue cone monochromacy	1728–1774	England	Writer	Among the oldest believed incidences of colorblindness.	
Jonny Greenwood		red–green	b. 1971	England	Composer, member of Radiohead		
Neil Harbisson		achromatopsia	b. 1984	Spain; United Kingdom; Ireland	Artist, musician, political activist	Started a project in 2003 to develop a sensor that transposed color frequencies into sound frequencies.	
Cal Henderson			b. 1981	United Kingdom	Programmer	Worked on applications to make the Internet more accessible to colorblind people.	
Matt Holland		red–green	b. 1974	England; Ireland	Association football player		
Niall Horan			b. 1993	Ireland	Musician		
Richard Hughes		red–green	b. 1975	England	Musician, member of Keane		
Jake Humphrey		red–green	b. 1978	England	TV presenter, journalist	Publicly stated on BBC Radio 5 Live comedy sports show Fighting Talk.	
Ian Hunter		red–green	b. 1979	England	Cricketer	Publicly stated in BBC interview.	
John Kay		achromatopsia	b. 1944	Germany; Canada	Lead singer of Steppenwolf	Legally blind because of the severity of colorblindness.	
Graham Kennedy			1934–2005	Australia	Entertainer		
Gaurav Khanna			b. 1981	India	TV Actor	Revealed during a stint on Celebrity MasterChef India.	
Brian Kibler			b. 1980	United States	Game designer	Publicly stated on his Twitter account.	
Kim Sang-jin		red–green		Republic of Korea	Animator	Was barred from art school, so studied economics; animated for Disney for 20 years.	
Yair Lapid			b. 1963	Israel	Journalist, politician	Was known to wear a black shirt because of his colorblindness.	
Howie Mandel			b. 1955	Canada	TV host	Publicly stated: "I'm colorblind".	
Nicholas U. Mayall			1906–1993	United States	Astronomer	Dissuaded from becoming a Mining Engineer.	
Matt Meese			b. 1983	United States	Comedian	Has joked about his colorblindness.	
Jose M. Mendoza				Philippines	Sculptor	Worked as a color separator in a publishing house for three years.	
Charles Meryon			1821–1868	France	Artist	Focused on etching instead of painting.	
Peter Milton		deuteranopia	b. 1930	United States	Artist, teacher	Horrified to learn that his landscapes were pink, so he switched to monochrome art.	
Christopher Paolini		red–green	b. 1983	United States	Author (Eragon)	Gave some of his characters red-green CVD.	
Logan Paul		red–green	b. 1995	United States	YouTuber, actor	Caused controversy for allegedly faking his reaction to color-corrective lenses in a vlog.	
Jan Pol		red–green	b. 1942	Netherlands	Veterinarian, TV host		
Clifton Pugh		protanopia	1924–1990	Australia	Artist	Won three Archibald Prizes.	
Cory Brandan Putman			b. 1976	United States	Musician		
Eddie Redmayne			b. 1982	England	Actor	Publicly stated that he is colorblind.	
Rachael Scdoris		achromatopsia	b. 1985	United States	Musher	First legally blind person to complete the Iditarod.	
Keanu Reeves			b. 1964	Lebanon; Canada	Actor		
Nicolas Winding Refn			b. 1970	Denmark	Director, screenwriter, producer	Publicly stated that he is unable to see mid-tones but has not specified which colors.	
Chris Rogers			b. 1977	Australia	Cricketer	Struggles with ball color.	
Fred Rogers		red–green	1928–2003	United States	Children's television presenter (Mister Rogers' Neighborhood)		
Roger Staubach		red–green	b. 1942	United States	NFL quarterback	Naval officer who could not distinguish port (red) from starboard (green).	
Rod Stewart		red–green	b. 1945	England	Singer-songwriter	Held a job at 15 selling and designing wallpaper.	
Tim Tebow			b. 1987	United States	NFL quarterback	Was confused by his daughter's gender reveal party.	
Vinny Testaverde		red–green	b. 1963	United States	NFL quarterback	First overall draft pick in 1987.	
Mark Twain		red-green	1835–1910	United States	Author	Regularly joked about his colorblindness.	
Matthew Wade			b. 1987	Australia	Cricketer	Struggles with ball color.	
Mark Williams		red–green	b. 1975	Wales	Snooker player	Has mistakenly sunk the wrong balls while playing.	
Neil Young		red–green	b. 1945	Canada	Musician		
Mark Zuckerberg		red–green	b. 1984	United States	Founder of Facebook		
