= Cell therapy =

Therapy in which cellular material is injected into a patient

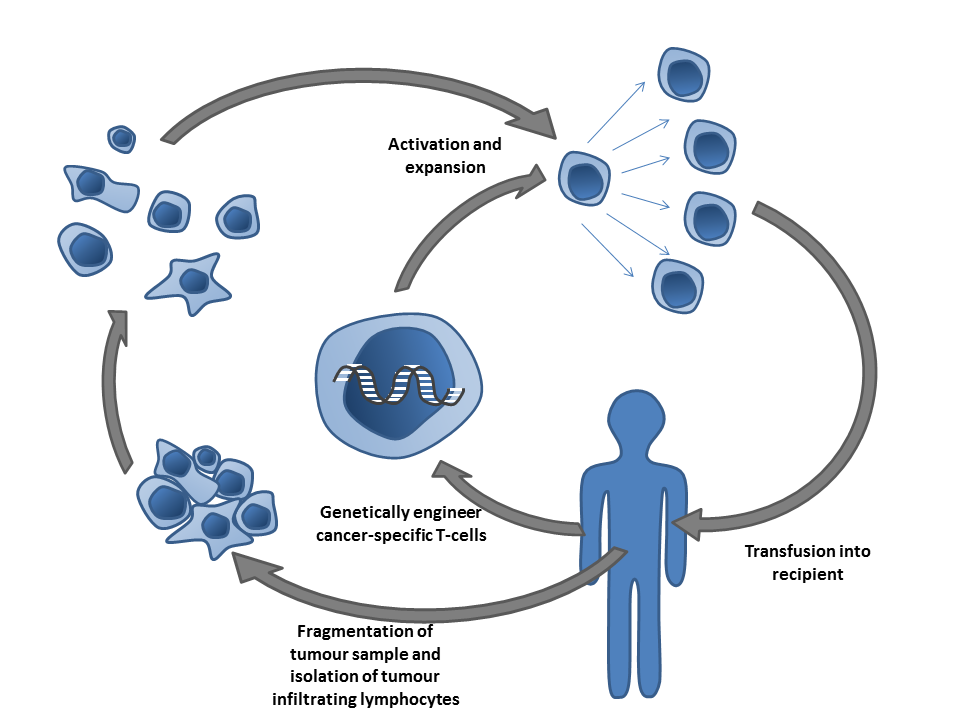
Adoptive T-cell therapy. Cancer specific T-cells can be obtained by fragmentation and isolation of tumour infiltrating lymphocytes, or by genetically engineering cells from peripheral blood. The cells are activated and grown prior to transfusion into the recipient (tumour bearer).

Cell therapy (also called cellular therapy, cell transplantation, or cytotherapy) is a therapy in which viable cells are injected, grafted or implanted into a patient in order to effectuate a medicinal effect, for example, by transplanting T-cells capable of fighting cancer cells via cell-mediated immunity in the course of immunotherapy, or grafting stem cells to regenerate diseased tissues.

Cell therapy originated in the nineteenth century when scientists experimented by injecting animal material in an attempt to prevent and treat illness. Although such attempts produced no positive benefit, further research found in the mid twentieth century that human cells could be used to help prevent the human body rejecting transplanted organs, leading in time to successful bone marrow transplantation as has become common practice in treatment for patients that have compromised bone marrow after disease, infection, radiation or chemotherapy. In recent decades, however, stem cell and cell transplantation has gained significant interest by researchers as a potential new therapeutic strategy for a wide range of diseases, in particular for degenerative and immunogenic pathologies.

== History ==
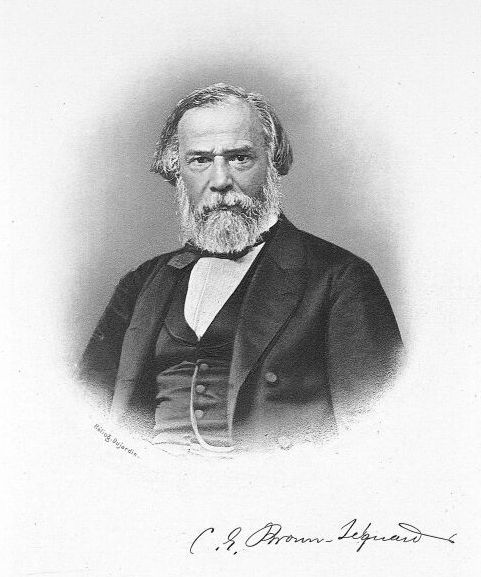
Charles-Édouard Brown-Séquard – tried to stop aging by injecting animal testicle extract.

Cell therapy can be defined as therapy in which cellular material is injected or otherwise transplanted into a patient. The origins of cell therapy can perhaps be traced to the nineteenth century, when Charles-Édouard Brown-Séquard (1817–1894) injected animal testicle extracts in an attempt to stop the effects of aging. In 1931 Paul Niehans (1882–1971) – who has been called the inventor of cell therapy – attempted to cure a patient by injecting material from calf embryos. Niehans claimed to have treated many people for cancer using this technique, though his claims have never been validated by research.

In 1953 researchers found that laboratory animals could be helped not to reject organ transplants by pre-inoculating them with cells from donor animals; in 1968, in Minnesota, the first successful human bone marrow transplantation took place. In more recent work, cell encapsulation is pursued as a means to shield therapeutic cells from the host immune response. Recent work includes micro-encapsulating cells in a gel core surrounded by a solid, but permeable, shell.

Bone marrow transplants are the most common and well established cell transplantation therapies. The first recording of a successful bone marrow transplant, dates back to 1956 by dr. E Donnall Thomas, who treated a leukemia patient with their twin-siblings bone marrow. In general, for patients presenting damaged or destroyed bone marrow, for example after chemotherapy and/or radiation for acute myeloid leukemia (AML), bone marrow derived cells can be infused into the patients blood stream. Here the injected cells are able to home into the affected bone marrow, integrate, proliferate and recover or re-establish its biological function e.g. the haematopoiesis. Annually an estimated 18,000 patients require potentially life-saving bone marrow transplants in the US.

For a long time, bone marrow transplantation was the only clinically applicable method of cell transplantation, however, since the 1990s, cell therapy has been investigated for a wide scale of pathologies and disorders. Cell therapy provided a novel approach to effectuate therapeutic efficacy. Previously, medical agents could only be effective by directing and inducing the patients own cells. However, in many diseases and disorders, cell are compromised by e.g. senescence, limited blood supply (ischemia), inflammation, or simply a reduction in the number of cells. Cell therapy offers a new strategy that supports the introduction of new and active cells to restore previously compromised or deteriorated tissue- and organ structures. As such, in recent times, cell therapy has been recognized as an important field in the treatment of human disease, and investigations are ongoing in articular cartilage, brain tissue, spine, heart, cancers, etc. As a consequence cell therapy as a strategy has been attracting significant investments by commercial entities which suggest strong prospects for future growth.

In 2021 Atara biotherapeutics became the first ever allogeneic T cell therapy company to be reviewed by any regulatory agency in the world (EMA)

== Mechanisms of action ==
Cell therapy is targeted at many clinical indications in multiple organs and by several modes of cell delivery. Accordingly, the specific mechanisms of action involved in the therapies are wide-ranging. However, there are two main principles by which cells facilitate therapeutic action:

1. Stem, progenitor, or mature cell engraftment, differentiation, and long-term replacement of damaged tissue. In this paradigm multipotent or unipotent cells differentiate into a specific cell type in the lab or after reaching the site of injury (via local or systemic administration). These cells then integrate into the site of injury, replacing damaged tissue, and thus facilitate improved function of the organ or tissue. An example of this is the use of cells to replace cardiomyocytes after myocardial infarction, to facilitate angiogenesis in ischemic limb disease, or the production of cartilage matrix in intervertebral disc degeneration.
2. Cells that have the capacity to release soluble factors such as cytokines, chemokines, and growth factors which act in a paracrine or endocrine manner. These factors facilitate self-healing of the organ or region by inducing local (stem) cells or attracting cells to migrate towards the transplantation site. Early cell passages have been shown to be more efficient paracrine activity than later passages. The delivered cells (via local or systemic administration) remain viable for a relatively short period (days-weeks) and then die. This includes cells that naturally secrete the relevant therapeutic factors, or which undergo epigenetic changes or genetic engineering that causes the cells to release large quantities of a specific molecule. Examples of this include cells that secrete factors which facilitate angiogenesis, anti-inflammation, and anti-apoptosis. This mode of action is proposed by companies such as Pluristem and Pervasis that use adherent stromal cells or mature endothelial cells to treat peripheral artery disease and arteriovenous access complications.
3. A combination of both cell engraftment of buccal epithelial cells along with IGF-1 secreted by buccal epithelial tissue derived in vitro cultured cells has been reported to yield healing of urethrotomy wound after cell transplantation in the management of male urethral stricture.

== Cell therapy strategies ==
=== Allogeneic ===
In allogeneic cell therapy the donor is a different person to the recipient of the cells. In pharmaceutical manufacturing, the allogenic methodology is promising because unmatched allogenic therapies can form the basis of "off the shelf" products. There is research interest in attempting to develop such products to treat conditions including Crohn's disease and a variety of vascular conditions.

=== Autologous ===
In autologous cell therapy, cells are transplanted that are derived from the patients own tissues. Multiple clinical studies are ongoing that obtain stromal cells from bone-marrow, adipose tissue, or peripheral blood to be transplanted at sites of injury or stress; which is being actively explored for e.g. cartilage and muscle repair. It could also involve the isolation of matured cells from diseased tissues, to be later re-implanted at the same or neighboring tissues; a strategy being assessed in clinical trials for e.g. the spine in preventing disc reherniation or adjacent disc disease. The benefit of an autologous strategy is that there is limited concern for immunogenic responses or transplant rejection. Nevertheless, an autologous strategy is often costly due to patient-by-patient processing, thus preventing the option to create large quality-controlled batches. Moreover, autologous strategies generally do not allow for product quality and effectiveness testing prior to transplantation, as it is highly donor (thus patient) dependent. This is a particular concern as often the patient functioning as donor is diseased, and this can impact cell potency and quality.

=== Xenogeneic ===
In xenogeneic cell therapies, the recipient will receive cells from another species. For example, the transplantation of pig derived cells to humans. Currently, xenogeneic cell therapies primarily involve human cell transplantation into experimental animal models for assessment of efficacy and safety, however future advances could potentially enable xenogeneic strategies to humans as well.

== Types of cells ==
=== Human embryonic stem cells ===
Research into human embryonic stem cells is controversial, and regulation varies from country to country, with some countries banning it outright. Nevertheless, these cells are being investigated as the basis for a number of therapeutic applications, including possible treatments for diabetes and Parkinson's disease.

=== Neural stem cell therapy ===
Neural stem cells (NSCs) are the subject of ongoing research for possible therapeutic applications, for example for treating a number of neurological disorders such as Parkinson's disease and Huntington's disease.

=== Mesenchymal stem cell therapy ===
MSCs are immunomodulatory, multipotent and fast proliferating. These capabilities mean they can be used for a wide range of treatments including immune-modulatory therapy, bone and cartilage regeneration, myocardium regeneration and the treatment of Hurler syndrome, a skeletal and neurological disorder.

Researchers have demonstrated the use of MSCs for the treatment of osteogenesis imperfecta (OI). Horwitz et al. transplanted bone marrow (BM) cells from human leukocyte antigen (HLA)-identical siblings to patients with OI. Results show that MSCs can develop into normal osteoblasts, leading to fast bone development and reduced fracture frequencies. A more recent clinical trial showed that allogeneic fetal MSCs transplanted in utero in patients with severe OI can engraft and differentiate into bone in a human fetus.

Besides bone and cartilage regeneration, cardiomyocyte regeneration with autologous BM MSCs has also been reported recently. Introduction of BM MSCs following myocardial infarction (MI) resulted in significant reduction of damaged regions and improvement in heart function. Clinical trials for treatment of acute MI with Prochymal by Osiris Therapeutics are underway. Also, a clinical trial revealed huge improvements in nerve conduction velocities in Hurler's Syndrome patients infused with BM MSCs from HLA-identical siblings.

=== Hematopoietic stem cell transplantation ===
Hematopoietic stem cells (HSCs), derived from bone marrow or blood, are cells with the abilities to self-renew and to differentiate into all types of blood cells, especially those involved in the human immune system. Thus, they can be used to treat blood and immune disorders. Since human bone marrow grafting was first published in 1957, there have been significant advancements in HSCs therapy. Following that, syngeneic marrow infusion and allogeneic marrow grafting were performed successfully. HSCs therapy can also render its cure by reconstituting damaged blood-forming cells and restoring the immune system after high-dose chemotherapy to eliminate disease.

There are three types of HSC transplantation: syngeneic, autologous, and allogeneic transplants. Syngeneic transplantations occur between identical twins. Autologous transplantations use the HSCs obtained directly from the patient and hence avoid complications of tissue incompatibility; whereas allogeneic transplantations involve the use of donor HSCs, either genetically related or unrelated to the recipient. To lower the risks of transplant, which include graft rejection and graft-versus-host disease (GVHD), allogeneic HSCT must satisfy compatibility at the HLA loci (i.e. genetic matching to reduce the immunogenicity of the transplant).

Advances involving this type of cell are not limited to exploiting their intrinsic properties; they also include genetic modification to confer new function, such as the ability to produce new protective factors like IGF-1. Studies suggest that these approaches could represent a significant advance in protecting the nervous system and solwing down the progression of neurodegenerative diseases.

In addition to bone marrow-derived HSCs, the use of alternative sources such as umbilical cord blood (UCB) and peripheral blood stem cells (PBSCs) has been increasing. In comparison with bone marrow-derived HSC recipients, PBSC recipients who had myeloid malignancies reported a faster engraftment and better overall survival. The use of UCB requires less stringent HLA loci matching, although the time of engraftment is longer and graft failure rate is higher.

=== Differentiated or mature cell transplantation ===
Alternative to stem- or progenitor cells, investigations are exploring the transplantation of differentiated cells that only possess low or no proliferation ability. This tends to involve specialized cells able to facilitate specific function in the patients body (for example, transplantation of cardiomyocytes to repair heart function or islet cell transplantation for establishing insulin homeostasis in diabetes patients) or support/regenerate the extracellular matrix production of specific tissues (for example intervertebral disc repair by transplanting chondrocytes).

== Alternative medicine ==
In alternative medicine, cell therapy is defined as the injection of non-human cellular animal material in an attempt to treat illness. Quackwatch labels this as "senseless", since "cells from the organs of one species cannot replace the cells from the organs of other species" and because a number of serious adverse effects have been reported. Of this alternative, animal-based form of cell therapy, the American Cancer Society say: "Available scientific evidence does not support claims that cell therapy is effective in treating cancer or any other disease. It may in fact be lethal ...".

== Manufacturing ==
Despite being one of the fast growing areas within Life Sciences, the manufacturing of cell therapy products is largely hindered by small scale batches and labour-intensive processes.

A number of manufacturers are turning to automated methods of production, eliminating human involvement and risk of human error. Automated methods of cell therapy manufacturing have opened up larger scale production of higher quality products at lower cost.

== Supply chain ==
Logistics departments of biopharma companies experience new obstacles because of the introduction of new cell and gene therapy products, such as CAR T-cell therapies and allogeneic therapies. Cell and gene therapies require manufacturer and distributors alike to implement new systems and processes in order to ensure safe handling and delivery. Additionally, on-demand inventory therefore becomes more and more important, especially with regard to unforeseeable events like the COVID-19 pandemic, so that supply chain interruptions can be prevented. Furthermore, recent changes as a result of the COVID-19 pandemic and political instability in Europe, secondary to Brexit, have further impacted the logistics chain for cellular therapies.

== See also ==
- Stem cell
- Stem cell therapy
- Allotransplantation
- Autotransplantation
- Xenotransplantation
- Regenerative medicine
- Mesenchymal stem cell
- Hematopoietic stem cell transplantation
- Stem cell therapy for macular degeneration
