= Frithiof Holmgren =

Swedish physiologist (1831–1897)

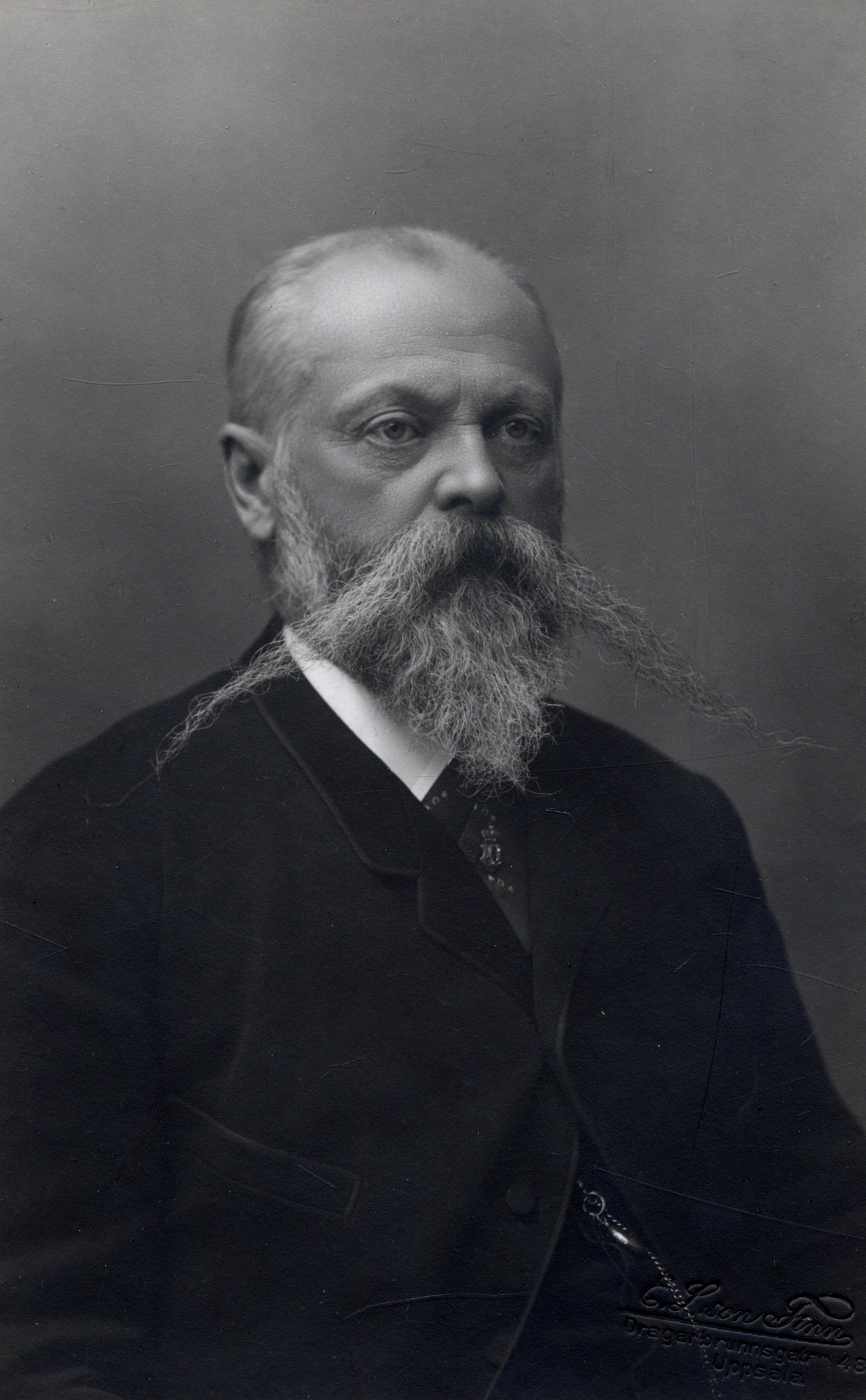
Alarik Frithiof Holmgren, M.D.

Alarik Frithiof Holmgren (October 22, 1831 – August 14, 1897) was a Swedish physician, physiologist and professor at Uppsala University, most noted for his research of color blindness. He was a vocal opponent of vivisection, and particularly the use of curare to immobilize subjects so they appeared peaceful while enduring great pain.

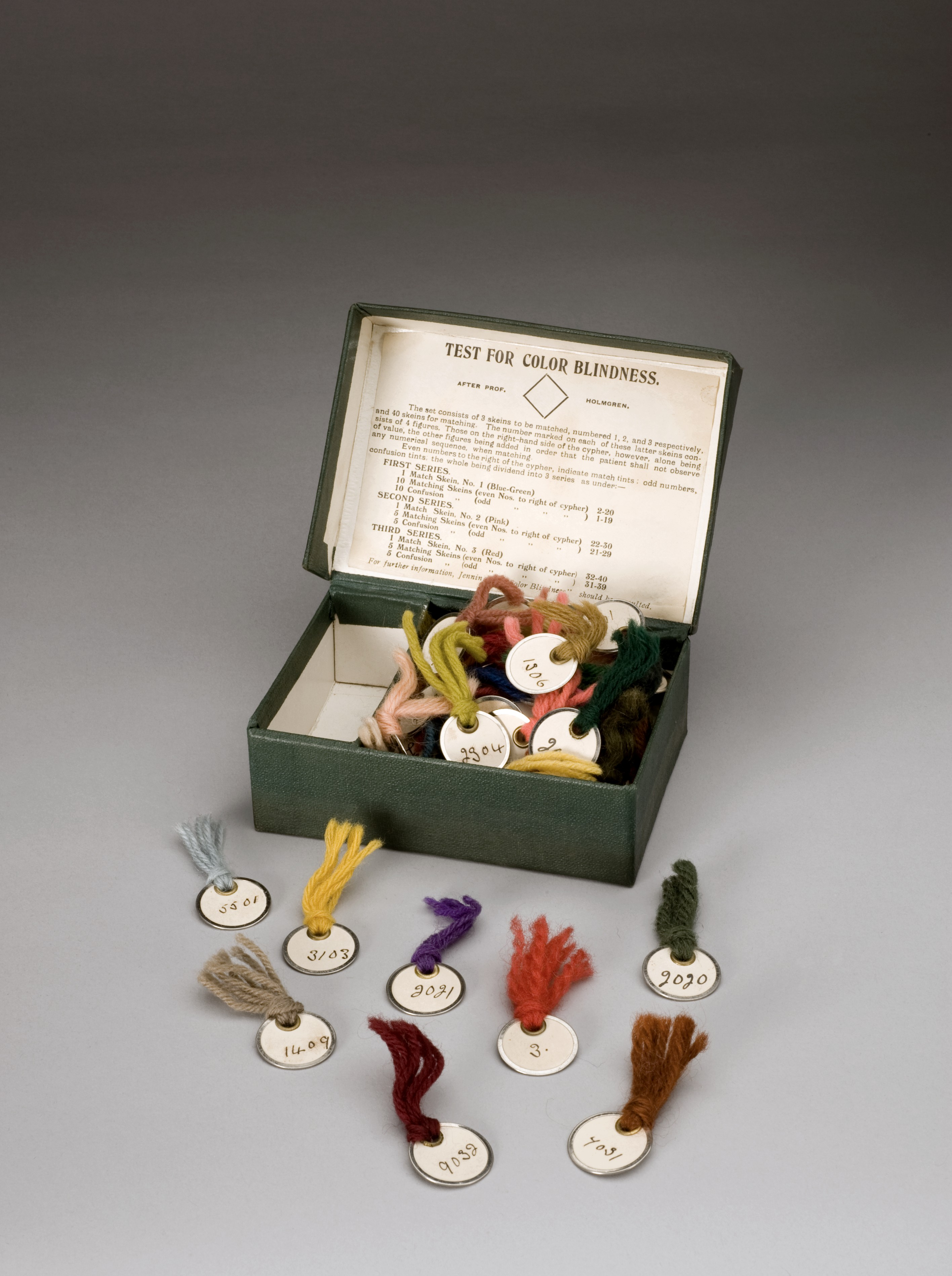
Holmgren's colored wool test for color blindness

== Biography ==
Holmgren was born in Östergötland, Sweden, where his father Anders was rector for the Motala-Vinnerstad parish. One of twelve siblings he studied at Linköping before going to Uppsala in 1850. From 1852 he served as a medical practitioner including during the cholera pandemic in Norrköping and Söderköping. He graduated as a Medical Doctor from Uppsala University in 1861. He went to Vienna and studied under Ernst Wilhelm von Brücke who sent him to work with Carl Ludwig at Leipzig. He joined the faculty of Uppsala University and in 1864, was appointed professor of physiology, the first in Sweden. He researched color blindness and his most notable work was about color blindness in relation to rail and sea transport. His research in 1869-70 took him to London, Berlin (Emil du Bois-Reymond), Heidelberg (Hermann von Helmholtz), Vienna and Paris (with Claude Bernard). Du Bois-Reymond inspired his work on attaching electrodes to the back and front of the eye of frogs to examine retinal responses. He devised a standardized test, now known as Holmgren's wool test, for color blindness testing in 1874. Following a railway crash at Lagerlunda in 1875, he advocated the need to preclude people with defective color vision from railway employment. This established the now standard practice of excluded color blind individuals from employment in certain sectors.

== Personal life ==
Holmgren was a member of the Royal Swedish Academy of Sciences from 1880. In 1869, he was married to the suffragist Ann-Margret Holmgren (1850–1940). They were the parents of eight children. The couple established a folk dance society and he campaigned for gymnastics training. They supported Artur Hazelius establish a museum of Swedish rural life. He died from arteriosclerosis. Both he and his wife were buried at Uppsala old cemetery.

== See also ==
- History of animal testing
