= Gene therapy for color blindness =

Experimental medical treatment

Gene therapy for color blindness is an experimental gene therapy of the human retina aiming to grant typical trichromatic color vision to individuals with congenital color blindness by introducing typical alleles for opsin genes. Animal testing for gene therapy began in 2007 with a 2009 breakthrough in squirrel monkeys suggesting an imminent gene therapy in humans. While the research into gene therapy for red-green colorblindness has lagged since then, successful human trials are ongoing for achromatopsia. Congenital color vision deficiency affects upwards of 200 million people in the world, which represents a large demand for this gene therapy.

== Color vision ==
The retina of the human eye contains photoreceptive cells called cones that allow color vision. A normal trichromat possesses three different types of cones to distinguish different colors within the visible spectrum. The three types of cones are designated L, M, and S cones, each containing an opsin sensitive to a different portion of the visible spectrum. More specifically, the L cone absorbs around 560 nm, the M cone absorbs near 530 nm, and the S cone absorbs near 420 nm. These cones transduce the absorbed light into electrical information to be relayed through other cells along the phototransduction pathway, before reaching the visual cortex in the brain.

The signals from the 3 cones are compared to each other to generate 3 opponent process channels. The channels are perceived as balances between red-green, blue-yellow and black-white.

== Color vision deficiency ==
Color vision deficiency (CVD) is the deviation of an individual's color vision from typical human trichromatic vision. Relevant to gene therapy, CVD can be classified in 2 groups.

=== Dichromacy ===
Dichromats have partial color vision. The most common form of dichromacy is red-green colorblindness. Dichromacy usually arises when one of the three opsin genes is deleted or otherwise fully nonfunctional. The effects and diagnosis depend on the missing opsin. Protanopes (very common) have no L-opsin, Deuteranopes (very common) have no M-opsin, and Tritanopes (rare) have no S-opsin. Accordingly, a missing cone means one of the opponent channels is inactive: red-green for protanopes/deuteranopes and blue-yellow for tritanopes. They therefore perceive a much reduced color space. Although dichromacy poses few critical problems in daily life, a lack of access to many occupations (where color vision may be safety-critical) is a large disadvantage.

Anomalous Trichromats are not missing an opsin gene, but rather have a mutated (or chimeric) gene. They have trichromatic vision, but with a smaller color gamut than typical color vision. Regarding gene therapy, they are equivalent to dichromats.

Blue Cone Monochromats are missing both the L- and M-opsin and therefore have no color vision. They are treated as a subset of dichromacy since a combination of gene therapies for protanopia and deuteranopia would be used.

=== Achromatopsia ===
Individuals with congenital achromatopsia tend to have typical opsin genes, but have a mutation in another gene downstream in the phototransduction pathway (e.g. GNAT2 protein) that prevents their cones (and therefore photopic vision) from functioning. Achromats rely solely on their scotopic vision. The severity of achromatopsia is much higher than dichromacy, not only in the lack of color vision, but also in co-occurring symptoms photophobia, nystagmus and poor visual acuity.

== Retinal gene therapy ==
Gene therapies aim to inject functional copies of missing or mutated genes into affected individuals by the use of viral vectors. Using a replication-defective recombinant adeno-associated virus (rAAV) as a vector, the cDNA of the affected gene can be delivered to the cones at the back of the retina typically via subretinal injection. Intravitreal injections are much less invasive, but not yet as effective as subretinal injections. Upon gaining the gene, the cone begins to express the new photopigment. The effect is ideally permanent.

== Research ==
The first retinal gene therapy to be approved by the FDA was Voretigene neparvovec in 2017, which treats Leber's congenital amaurosis, a genetic disorder that can lead to blindness. These treatments also use subretinal injections of AAV vector and are therefore foundational to research in gene therapy for color blindness.

Human L-cone photopigment have been introduced into mice. Since the mice possess only S cones and M cones, they are dichromats. M-opsin was replaced with a cDNA of L-opsin in the X chromosome of some mice. By breeding these "knock-in" transgenic mice, they generated heterozygous females with both an M cone and an L cone. These mice had improved range of color vision and have gained trichromacy, as tested by electroretinogram and behavioral tests. However, this is more difficult to apply in the form of gene therapy.

Recombinant AAV vector was to introduce the green fluorescent protein (GFP) gene in the cones of gerbils. The genetic insert was designed to only be expressed in S or M cones, and the expression of GFP in vivo was observed over time. Gene expression could stabilize if a sufficiently high dose of the viral vector is given.

In 2009, adult dichromatic squirrel monkeys were converted into trichromats using gene therapy. New world monkeys are polymorphic in their M-opsin, such that females can be trichromatic, but all males are dichromatic. Recombinant AAV vector was used to deliver a human L-opsin gene subretinally. A subset of the monkey's M-cones gained the L-opsin genes and began co-expressing the new and old photopigments. Electroretinograms demonstrated that the cones were expressing the new opsin and after 20 weeks a pseudoisochromatic color vision test demonstrated that the treated monkeys had indeed developed functional trichromatic vision.

Gene therapy was to restore some of the sight of mice with achromatopsia. The results were positive for 80% of the mice treated.

In 2010, gene therapy for a form of achromatopsia was performed in dogs. Cone function and day vision have been restored for at least 33 months in two young dogs with achromatopsia. However, this therapy was less efficient for older dogs.

In 2022, 4 young human ACHM2 and ACHM3 achromats were shown to have neurological responses (as measured with fMRI) to photopic vision that matched patterns generated by their scotopic vision after gene therapy. This inferred a photopic cone-driven system that was at least marginally functional. The methodology did not investigate novel color vision, though one respondent claimed to more easily interpret traffic lights. This may be considered the first case of a cure for colorblindness in humans.

In July 2023, a study found positive but limited improvements on congenital CNGA3 achromatopsia.

== Challenges ==
While the benefits of gene therapy to achromats typically outweigh the current risks, there are several challenges before large acceptance of gene therapy in dichromats can occur.

=== Safety ===
The procedure – namely the subretinal injection – is quite invasive, requiring several incisions and punctures in the eyeball. This poses a significant risk of infection and other complications. Subretinal injections methods promise to become less invasive with their application in other retinal gene therapies. They could also be replaced by intravitreal injections, which are significantly less invasive and can in theory be performed by a family doctor, but are less effective.

The permanence of these therapies is also in question. Mancuso et al. reported that the treated squirrel monkeys maintained 2 years of color vision after the treatment. However, if repeat injections are needed, there is also the concern of the body developing an immune reaction to the virus. If a body develops sensitivity to the viral vector, the success of the therapy could be jeopardized and/or the body may respond unfavorably. An editorial by J. Bennett points to Mancuso et al.'s use of an "unspecified postinjection corticosteroid therapy". Bennett suggests that the monkeys may have experienced inflammation due to the injection. However, the AAV virus that is commonly used for this study is non-pathogenic, and the body is less likely to develop an immune reaction.

=== Neuroplasticity ===
According to research by David H. Hubel and Torsten Wiesel, suturing shut one eye of monkeys at an early age resulted in an irreversible loss of vision in that eye, even after the suture was removed. The study concluded that the neural circuitry for vision is wired during a "critical period" in childhood, after which the visual circuitry can no longer be rewired to process new sensory input. Contrary to this finding, Mancuso et al.’s success in conferring trichromacy to adult squirrel monkeys suggests that it is possible to adapt the preexisting circuit to allow greater acuity in color vision. The researchers concluded that integrating the stimulus from the new photopigment as an adult was not analogous to vision loss following visual deprivation.

It is yet unknown how the animals that gain a new photopigment are perceiving the new color. While the article by Mancuso et al. states that the monkey has indeed gained trichromacy and gained the ability to discriminate between red and green, they claim no knowledge of how the animal internally perceives the sensation.

=== Ethics ===
As a way to introduce new genetic information to change a person's phenotype, a gene therapy for color blindness is open to the same ethical questions and criticisms as gene therapy in general. These include issues around the governance of the therapy, whether treatment should be available only to those who can afford it, and whether the availability of treatment creates a stigma for those with color blindness. Given the large number of people with color blindness, there is also the question of whether color blindness is a disorder. Furthermore, even if gene therapy succeeds in converting incomplete colorblind individuals to trichromats, the degree of satisfaction among the subjects is unknown. It is uncertain how the quality of life will improve (or worsen) after the therapy.

The gene therapy for converting dichromats to trichromats can also be used hypothetically to "upgrade" typical trichromats to tetrachromats by introducing a new opsin genes. This begs the ethics of designer babies that contain genes not available naturally in the human gene pool. In 2022, the lab of Jay Neitz engineered a novel opsin sensitive to wavelengths between the typical human S- (420 nm) and M- (530 nm) opsins, i.e. the novel opsin at 493 nm. This allowed the opsin to be clearly visible in ERGs, but could be used to create tetrachromacy.

== See also ==
- Color vision
- Gene therapy
- Achromatopsia
- Color blindness
- Gene therapy of the human retina
- Stem cell therapy for macular degeneration
