= Stem cell therapy for macular degeneration =

Use of stem cells to treat macular degeneration

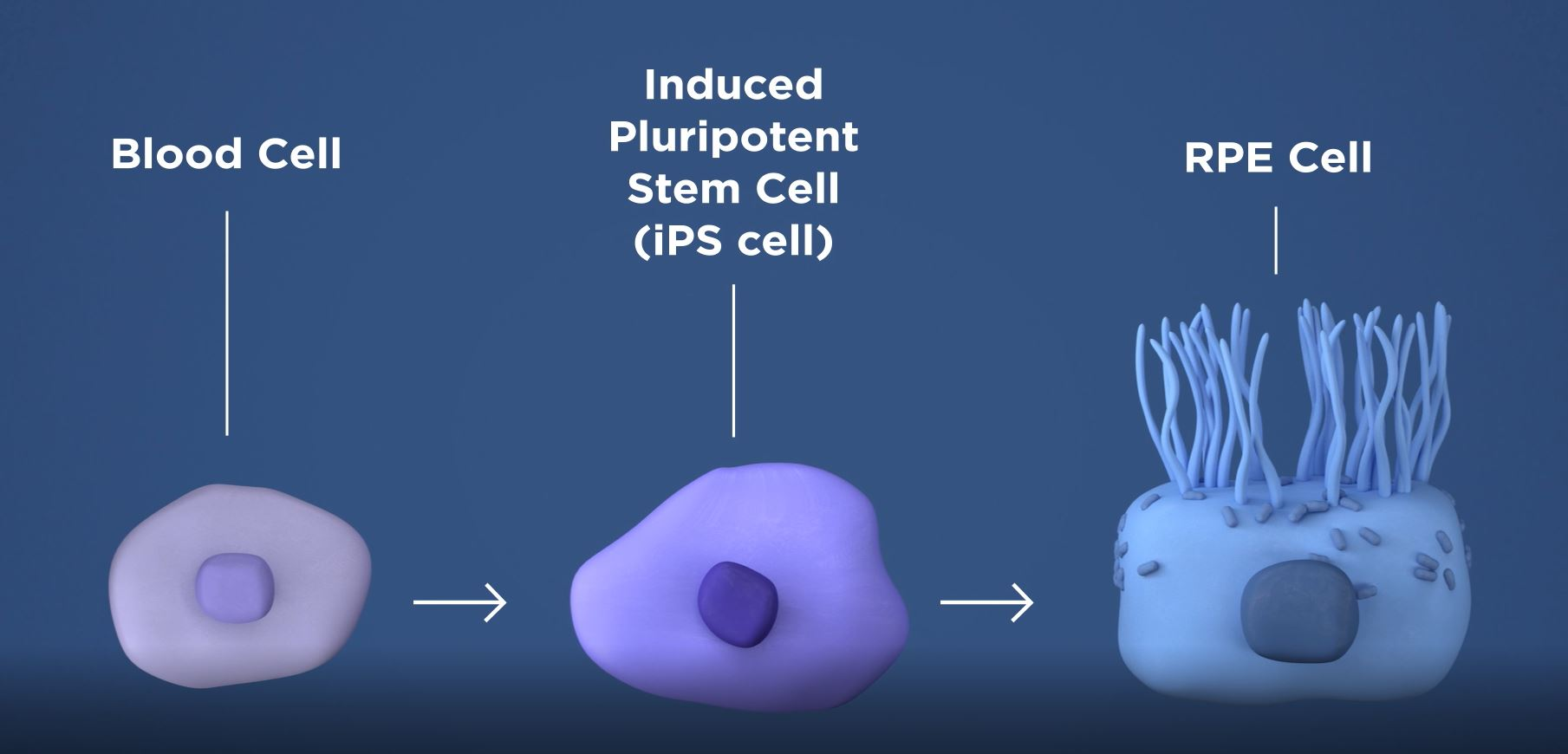
Induced pluripotent stem cell taken from blood cell and converted in retinal pigment epithelium

Stem cell therapy for macular degeneration is an emerging treatment approach aimed at restoring vision in individuals suffering from various forms of macular degeneration, particularly age-related macular degeneration (AMD). This therapy involves the transplantation of stem cells into the retina to replace damaged or lost retinal pigment epithelium (RPE) and photoreceptor cells, which are critical for central vision. Clinical trials have shown promise in stabilizing or improving visual function, but are nevertheless inefficient.

== Types ==
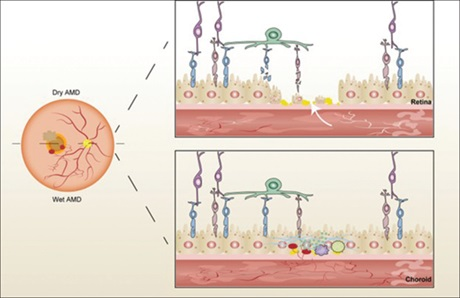
A representation of the underlying mechanisms of Dry and Wet Age-Related Macular Degeneration.

Age-related macular degeneration (AMD) is associated with abnormality in the retinal pigment epithelium (RPE). However, since the RPE is incapable of regeneration on its own, stem cell based therapy shows potential.

Most stem cell therapies utilize application of derived retinal pigment epithelium (RPE) cells. Transplantation of RPE can take two forms, either as cell sheets or cell suspension. Cell sheets involve the transplantation of a monolayer, which is formed through the use of biocompatible tissue-engineered materials that have been inoculated with RPE cells. Cell suspension utilizes the transplantation of RPE cells and other components into the eye.

There are treatments being developed beyond RPE transplantation, such as the transplantation of Mesenchymal Stem Cells.

=== Embryonic Stem Cells (ESCs) ===
Studies have shown that implantation of human ESCs in animal models displayed improvements in visual performance. These studies mention concerns over complications of transplants, stability, and rejection. There have been several clinical trials in humans, however, in which no adverse immune response or abnormal tumorigenic proliferation has been observed.

A current direction for ESC therapy is the derivation and transplanting of retinal pigment epithelial cells from ESCs for dry age-related macular degeneration.

ASP7317 is one developing human ESC treatment for geographic atrophy caused by dry AMD. Currently it is in phase Ib of clinical testing, and was recruiting participants for dose ranging trials as of January 2025.

=== Induced Pluripotent Stem Cells (iPSCs) ===
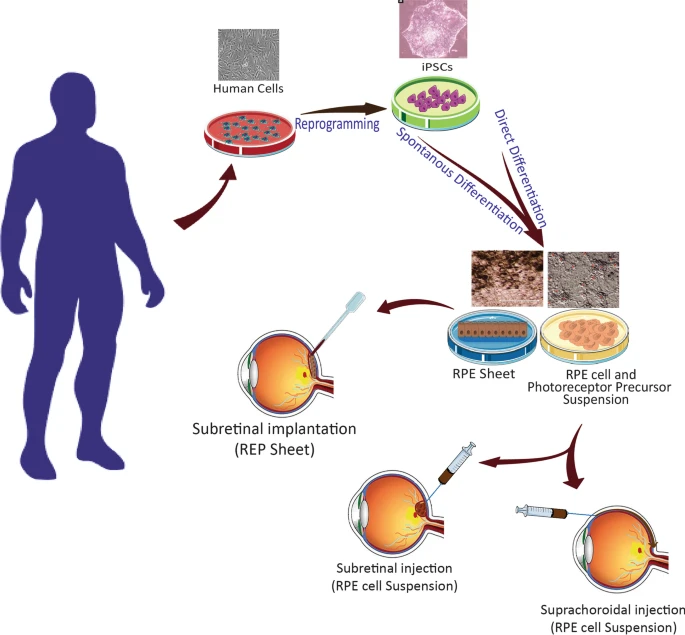
A figure displaying a differentiation overview from human cells to RPE sheets and cell suspensions derived from iPSCs.

In response to complication and ethical concerns of ESC based therapy, iPSC derived treatments could function as an alternative. Studies indicated the ability of iPSCs to differentiate into various retinal cell types such as photoreceptors and RPE cells.

While transplanting of iPSCs and iPSC derived treatments in mice retina have resulted in improved retinal function, the practicality of such treatment is still unclear. Studies in humans have indicated that iPSC derived RPE transplantations can not only be safe, but successful. There are concerns regarding immune rejection of transplants and oncogenic mutations though.

In one procedure, the neovascular membrane RPE complex was removed before subsequent transplantation of iPSC derived RPE cells under the retina. After a year post surgery, consistent results were still observed despite the patient having cystic macular edema.

=== Mesenchymal Stem Cells (MSCs) ===
Derived from bone marrow or adipose tissue, MSCs have shown potential in retinal degenerative cell therapy. This is in part due to the immunoregulatory properties of MSCs, as well as their ability to promote the proliferation of ocular cells.

While studies using intravitreal interjections of MSCs have displayed a positive effect on the retina and vision function, an additional study utilizing intravitreal interjections of bone marrow mononuclear stem cells showed no improvement in retinal function. Through clinical trials, a variety of results have been observed with some improvements in retinal function being transient, while other persisted.

With the increase in MSC therapies, reports of associated ocular complications have been reported. However, a study utilizing a suprachoroidal approach where MSCs were transplanted under a deep scleral flap within the suprachoroidal space expressed improvements in visual function six months after the treatment. This method displayed reduced risks of complications.

== History ==
The first fetal retinal transplant into the anterior chamber of animal eyes was reported in 1959. In 1980, experiments involving cell cultures of retinal pigment epithelium (RPE) began. Human RPE cells grown in culture were subsequently transplanted into animal eyes, initially using open techniques and later through closed cavity vitrectomy methods.In 1991, Gholam Peyman attempted to transplant RPE in humans, but the success rate was limited. Later efforts focused on allogenic fetal RPE cell transplantation, which faced significant challenges due to immune rejection. It was observed that rejection rates were lower in cases of dry age-related macular degeneration (AMD) compared to the wet form of the disease. Autologous RPE transplantation became more common, using two main techniques: RPE suspension and full-thickness RPE-choroid transplantation. Clinical outcomes from autologous RPE-choroid transplantation, where tissue from the eye's periphery is transplanted to a diseased area, have shown promise.

Since 2003, researchers have successfully transplanted corneal stem cells into damaged eyes to restore vision. Sheets of retinal cells used in these procedures were initially harvested from aborted fetuses, which raised ethical concerns for some. These retinal sheets, when transplanted over damaged corneas, stimulated repair and eventually restored vision. In June 2005, a team led by Sheraz Daya at Queen Victoria Hospital in Sussex, England, restored sight in forty patients using a similar technique with adult stem cells sourced from the patient, a relative, or a cadaver.

In 2009, the first ESC derived retinal pigment epithelium cell suspension transplantation for macular disease was performed by Ocata Therapeutics.In 2010, the United States Food and Drug Administration approved phase I/II clinical trials for retinal pathology stem cell therapies in humans.

In 2014, surgeons at Riken Institute's Center for Developmental Biology reported the first transplantation of induced pluripotent stem cells (iPSCs) into a human patient. This clinical study involved creating a retinal sheet from iPSCs, developed by Shinya Yamanaka, which were reprogrammed from the patient's own mature cells. The retinal sheet was transplanted into a woman in her 70s suffering from age-related macular degeneration (AMD), a condition that blurs central vision and can lead to blindness. The use of iPSCs aimed to halt the progression of AMD. In March 2017, the team conducted the first successful transplant of retinal cells created from donor-derived iPSCs into a patient with advanced wet AMD. This surgery was made more efficient by using "super donor" cells, derived from individuals with specific white blood cell types that reduce the risk of immune rejection. Approximately 250,000 retinal pigment epithelial cells, generated from these donor-derived iPSCs, were transplanted into the patient's eye.

In April 2024, Eyecyte-RPE was approved for its first human trial. The researchers, working in India, aim to create a pluripotent stem cell treatment for mid to late stage geographic atrophy that will be more cost-efficient than existing cell and gene therapies.

== See also ==
- Cell therapy
- Ophthalmology
- Stem cell therapy
- Macular degeneration
- Gene therapy for color blindness
- Gene therapy of the human retina
