= Farnsworth Lantern Test =

Test for color vision

- Synonyms: FALANT
- Purpose: screens for red-green deficiencies

The Farnsworth Lantern Test, or FALANT, is a color vision test originally developed specifically to screen sailors for tasks requiring color vision, such as identifying signal lights at night. It screens for red-green color blindness, but not the much rarer blue color deficiency.

== History ==
The test was developed by Commander Dean Farnsworth of the United States Navy while stationed at the Naval Submarine Research Laboratory in New London, Connecticut during World War II. After its adoption by the United States Navy in 1954 as the standard color vision test for sailors aboard ship, it has additionally been used to screen flying personnel.

== Test procedure ==
The test consists of showing a pair of vertically oriented lights consisting of combinations of either red, green or yellow-white. The test subject is asked to identify the two colors (some of which are identical). Nine color pairs are administered during the test, beginning with a red/green combination, to allow the patient to see these two colors prior to seeing a white light, which decreases testing errors. The examinee is shown the target for only two seconds, as color-deficient patients can sometimes correctly identify the colors with prolonged exposure. The yellow-white light, or one of the identical paired lights, employs a 50% neutral gray filter to reduce luminance cues to the color-deficient patient. Random presentation reduces memorization of the test sequence by motivated persons.

== Results assessment ==
Errors by color-deficient subjects tend to be of two types. The first is mis-calling the white light the complement of the colors presented. For example, red-white is called as "red-green", or green-white as "green-red". The second is when a pair of lights of the same color but differing in brightness by 50% is displayed; the brighter identical color is called as "white". For example, green(dim)-green(bright) is called as "green-white". Dichromats, by definition, cannot distinguish any of the colors, and can only make correct answers by random guessing.

The Military Medical Purchase Description specifies the lights in the FALANT in terms of percent luminous transmittance and 1931 CIE x,y chromaticity coordinates, calculated from Illuminant A, from spectrophotometric measurements of the glass filter components that make up the lantern. Illuminant A is approximated by a 115 volt, 40 watt T8 tungsten lamp inside the FALANT.

By design, the FALANT allows mild color-blindness conditions to pass the test, while still excluding most of the moderate or severe cases of color-deficiency. The test is intended to mimic the types of situations requiring color vision that a sailor would find while serving aboard a ship. The test is passed if there were no mistakes in the first nine pairs, or only two mistakes in the eighteen presentations shown to the examinee.

== Test evaluation ==
Research has shown a sensitivity of only 25% for detecting color vision deficiencies, and occasionally the FALANT allows moderate or even severely color deficient trichromats to pass, especially if given enough attempts with allowed errors, or given improperly by the technician. Administration errors are frequent, when not given in the correct lighting conditions, timing or distance.

Testing errors are reduced by standardization of the verbal instructions, rules for administration, and scoring method. Four important phrases are: (1) "Remember, only three colors - red, green, and white", (2) "They look like signal lights at a distance", (3) "Call out the colors as soon as you see them", (4) "They can be in any combination or the same".

== Usage in aviation ==
The FALANT is accepted by the United States Federal Aviation Administration as a test of color vision for the purpose of obtaining a pilot's license. However, the United States Air Force discontinued use of the FALANT in 1993 due to its frequent failure to identify cases of color blindness considerably more serious than the test was intended to let pass.

In the FedEx Express Flight 1478 crash, the pilot flying was red-green color-blind and would have struggled to read a Precision approach path indicator (PAPI). He had passed the FALANT many times, but failed a battery of more sensitive tests.The original FALANT apparatus is no longer manufactured, but many modern equivalents of various levels of sophistication, such as the Optec-900, are available today.

== See also ==
- Color blindness
