= Paul Niehans =

Swiss surgeon

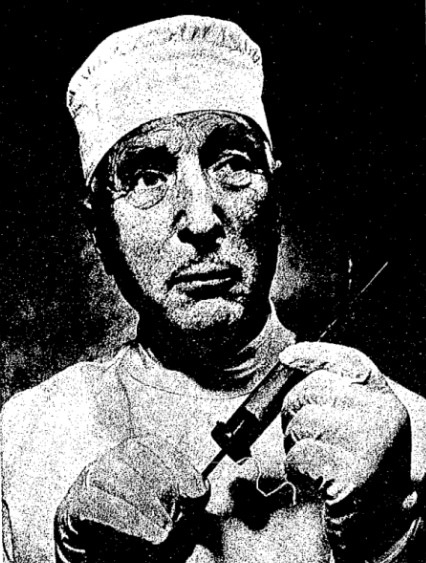
- Born: 21 November 1882; Bern, Switzerland
- Died: 1 September 1971 (aged 89); Montreux, Switzerland
- Known for: Developer of cellular therapy with the Niehans Method
- Awards: Member of the Papal Academy of Science; Noble Knight of the Military and Hospital of St Lavare, France
- Medical career
- Profession: Surgeon, medical writer
- Institutions: Paul Niehans Clinic, Hospitals in Vevey, Montreux and Aigle
- Sub-specialties: Regenerative medicine, rejuvenation, Cell therapy

Paul Niehans (21 November 1882 – 1 September 1971) was a Swiss surgeon and medical writer. He is best known for developing fresh cell therapy, a form of alternative medicine. Due to unproven rumors that he had treated famous celebrities and world leaders, his clinic speciliazing in fresh cell therapy became popular. In 1955, he was appointed to the Pontifical Academy of Sciences after providing services to Pope Pius XII. There is no medical evidence to suggest his fresh cell therapy is useful for any health problem, and it has not been approved in several countries for safety reasons.

== Biography ==
=== Early life ===
Niehans, the son of a doctor, was born in Bern, Switzerland. He initially studied theology, then switched to medicine. Niehans joined the Swiss Army in 1912, and he worked as a doctor during World War I.

== Fresh cell therapy ==
Niehans conducted in 1931, his first test of his "Niehans' Method", what would later be called fresh cell theory.

Fresh cell therapy is an alternative medicine where animal cells, primarily from sheep or bovine are extracted, dried or fresh, and are injected into the muscles of humans. Niehans promoted it as a cure for many diseases and ailments, everything from cancer, to anemia, diabetes, heart issues, homosexuality, impotence and sexual disfunction. He also advocated it as a form of breast enhancement.

There is no evidence it is useful for any health problem. Fresh cell therapy is considered an unproven method of cancer treatment and quackery by medical experts. In a 1963 investigation by the American Cancer Society, they found "no evidence that treatment with the Fresh Cell Therapy or "CT" results in any objective benefit in the treatment". There have been several instances of severe adverse effects including death.

In the United States and Switzerland, it is not legally available because of safety concerns and lack of proof of its effectiveness. The World Health Organization does not recognize its usefulness as a form of medical treatment.

== Sources ==
- Literature by and about Paul Niehans in the German National Library catalogue
- Gilles Lambert. (1959). Conquest of Age: The Extraordinary Story of Dr. Paul Niehans. Rinehart.
- E. Wolff: Vor 50 Jahren: Paul Niehans bringt den Begriff «Zellulartherapie» in die Öffentlichkeit. In: Schweizerische Ärztezeitung / Bulletin des médecins suisses / Bollettino dei medici svizzeri. 2002;83: Nr 32/33, S. 1726f. (Text als pdf-Datei)
- "Paul Niehans" in German, French and Italian in the online Historical Dictionary of Switzerland.
