= Lagerlunda rail accident =

1875 rail accident in Sweden

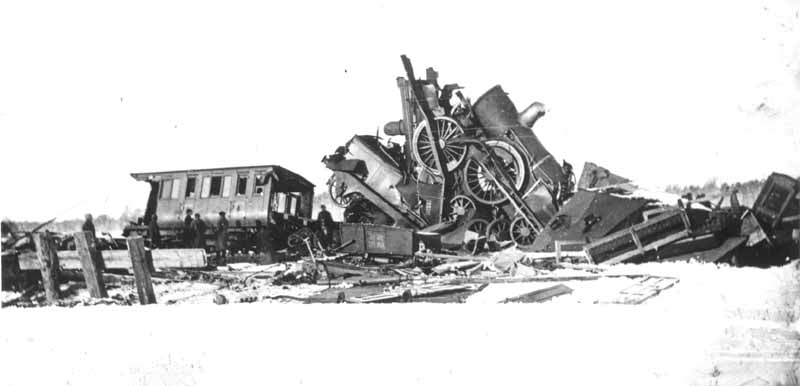
- The accident site, a few days after the crash.

Details
- Date: November 15, 1875 circa 01:11
- Location: Kapellån, between Malmslätt and Bankeberg
- Coordinates: 58.402°N 15.483°E
- Country: Sweden
- Line: Eastern Main Line
- Incident type: Head-on collision

Statistics
- Trains: 2
- Deaths: 9
- Injured: 3

The Lagerlunda rail accident occurred in the early hours of 15 November 1875 about 8 km (5.0 mi) west of Linköping in Östergötland, Sweden. Unclear signalling between a station master and a steam engine driver led to a train leaving the station although another train was approaching on the single line track. Nine people were killed in the head-on collision shortly after. The station master was sentenced to 6 months of prison.

A contemporary investigation by Swedish ophthalmologist Frithiof Holmgren suggested that color blindness on the part of the driver could have contributed to the accident, which prompted the introduction of mandatory color-vision screening of railroad personnel. However, more recent analyses dispute color blindness as the main cause of the accident.
