= Jin Kim (animator) =

South Korean animator

- Employer: Walt Disney Animation Studios

Korean name
- Hangul: 김상진
- RR: Gim Sangjin
- MR: Kim Sangjin

Jin Kim (Korean: 김상진, Korean name: Kim Sang-jin) is a South Korean animator and character designer best known for his work at Walt Disney Animation Studios from 1995–2016. He was the first Korean animator to work for Disney.

== Career ==
In 2016, Hong Sung-ho, president of Locus Studios, persuaded Kim to return to South Korea to work as executive creative director of the Korean feature animated film Red Shoes (which premiered in July 2019). According to Hong, at that time, Kim had been left with nothing new to design because Disney was then focused on developing sequels rather than entirely new films. Kim was also happy to work with an animation team in the Korean language for the first time since a three-year period in the South Korean animation industry at the beginning of his career.

In May 2018, Kim returned to Los Angeles to work on Pearl Studio/Netflix's film, Over the Moon, which was directed by fellow Disney animator Glen Keane. As of August 2019, Kim had joined a new project at Disney. He worked on both Raya and the Last Dragon and Encanto.

== Personal life ==
Kim has red-green color blindness. Due to Korean college admissions policies at the time, he was unable to get into art school and ended up majoring in economics in college. Regardless, he persisted in developing his drawing skills and was eventually able to embark on a career as an animator.

== Filmography ==
Year	Title	Credits	Characters
1986	Dooly the Little Dinosaur (TV Series)	Animator: Hando Heung-Up Co., Ltd. - 1987 - 1988	
1990–1991	The Adventures of Don Coyote and Sancho Panda (TV Series)	Animator, 1990	
1990–1991	Midnight Patrol: Adventures in the Dream Zone (TV Series)	Animator - 13 Episodes	
1990–1991	Tiny Toon Adventures (TV Series)	Animator - 17 Episodes	
1990–1991	Darkwing Duck (TV Series)	Animator - 6 Episodes	
1992	Goof Troop (TV Series)	Animator - 15 Episodes	
1992	The Plucky Duck Show (TV Series)	Animator - 2 Episodes	
1993	The Legends of Treasure Island (TV Series)	Key Animator - 3 Episodes	
1993	Bonkers (TV Series)	Animator - 4 Episodes	
1993	Spirou (TV Series)	Storyboard Artist - 1995	
1994	Aladdin (TV Series)	Animator - 12 Episodes	
1997	Hercules	Animator	Amphitryon and Alcmene
1999	Tarzan	Additional Animator	
2000	Fantasia 2000	Animator - Segments "Rhapsody in Blue", "Piano Concerto No. 2, Allegro, Opus 102", "Pomp and Circumstance - Marches 1, 2, 3, and 4" and "Firebird Suite - 1919 Version"	
2000	The Emperor's New Groove	Animator	Kuzco/Kuzco Llama
2002	Treasure Planet	Animator	Jim Hawkins
2004	Home on the Range	Animator	Buck
2005	Chicken Little	Animator	
2007	Meet the Robinsons	Animator	
2008	Glago's Guest (Short)	Character Designer	
2008	Bolt	Character Designer	
2009	The Princess and the Frog	Animator	Charlotte "Lottie" La Bouff
2010	Tangled	Character Designer	
2012	Wreck-It Ralph	Visual Development Artist	
2013	Frozen	Visual Development Artist	
2014	Big Hero 6	Character Designer Supervisor	
2016	Zootopia	Additional Visual Development Artist	
2016	Moana	Visual Development Artist	
2018	Ralph Breaks the Internet	Additional Visual Development Artist	
2018	Red Shoes and the Seven Dwarfs	Executive Creative Director	
2019	Frozen II	Additional Visual Development Artist	
2020	Over the Moon	Character Designer	
2021	Raya and the Last Dragon	Visual Development Artist	
2021	Belle	Character Designer	
2021	Encanto	Character Designer/Visual Development Artist/2D Animator	

== Awards and nominations ==
Year	Awards	Category	Recipient	Result
2015	42nd Annie Awards	Character Design in an Animated Feature Production	Big Hero 6	Nominated
