= EnChroma =

Eyeglasses marketed to color-blind people

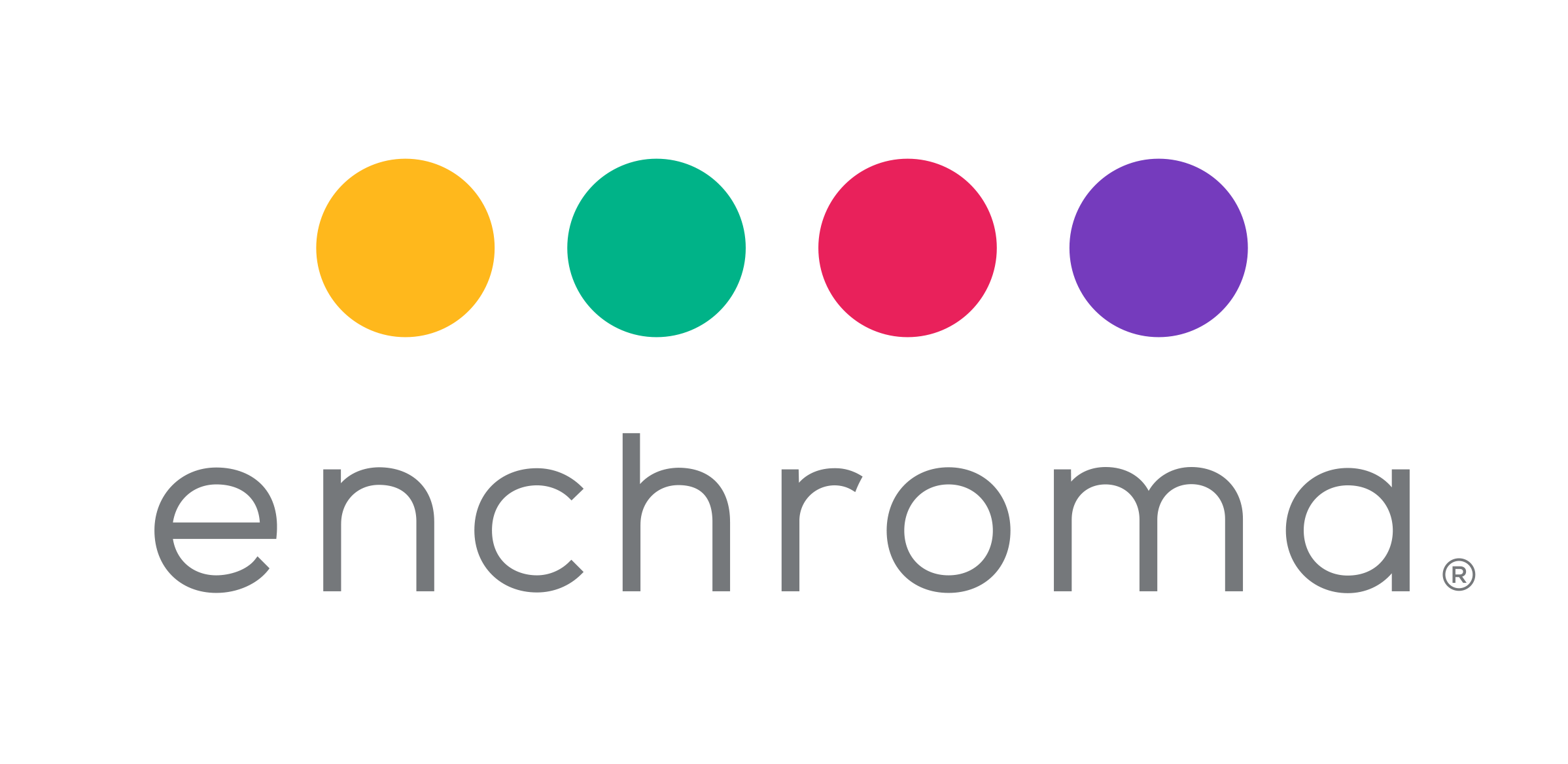
- Manufacturer: EnChroma
- Website: https://enchroma.com/

EnChroma are a brand of color corrective lenses designed to address the symptoms of red–green color blindness. Studies have shown that these lenses can alter the appearance of colors, but they do not restore normal color vision, and generally agree that they do not allow the wearer to see "new" colors.

Several peer-reviewed studies have nonetheless reported positive effects among anomalous trichromats in real-world or laboratory testing, including increased color discrimination. Additionally, research co-authored by EnChroma consultants John Werner and Kenneth Knoblauch has reported enhanced chromatic contrast perception and adaptive changes from long-term use.

== History ==
EnChroma lenses are designed, marketed and distributed by EnChroma, inc. in Berkeley, California. EnChroma glasses were invented accidentally in 2002 by Donald McPherson while trying to develop lenses to protect and aid surgeons during laser operations. The company received a grant from the NIH in 2005, the glasses were released to the public in 2012 and cheaper versions in 2014. In 2015, EnChroma teamed up with Valspar Paint in an advertising campaign titled "Color For All", which focused on the experience of trying on EnChroma glasses for the first time. This led new EnChroma owners to upload reaction videos, which earned the ad campaign three marketing awards by Chief Marketer, including best use of video and best use of social/viral marketing.

== Color blindness ==
The target users of the lenses have either deuteranomaly or protanomaly, both forms of red–green anomalous trichromacy, the most common forms of partial color blindness. The mechanism of red–green anomalous trichromacy sees the spectral sensitivity of the red- and green-sensitive cone opsins (L-opsin and M-opsin, respectively) shift towards each other, i.e. the L-opsin is shifted to shorter wavelengths (protanomaly) or the M-opsin is shifted to longer wavelengths (deuteranomaly). Either mechanism causes a larger overlap between the M- and L-opsin sensitivities, leading to a smaller color gamut, and less ability to differentiate colors along the red–green axis. Common colors of confusion include blue vs. purple, yellow vs. neon green, grey vs. cyan vs. pink, red vs. orange vs. green vs. brown. Neither dichromatic (protanopia or deuteranopia) users nor tritan users are targeted by EnChroma.

As of December 2023, EnChroma markets SuperX lenses to non-colorblind users.

== Working principle ==
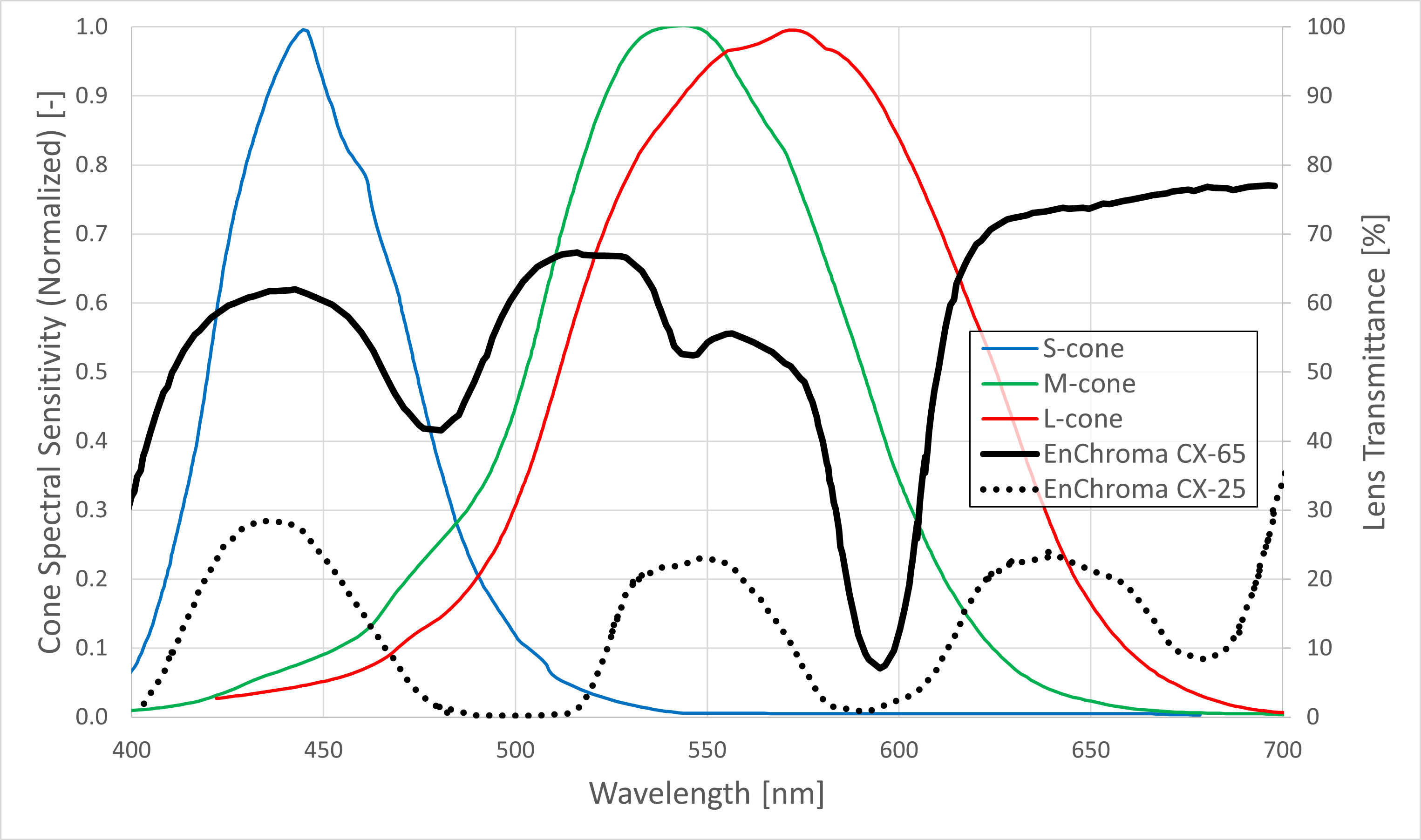
Transmittance of EnChroma color correcting lenses (indoor and outdoor) superimposed onto the normalized spectral sensitivities of the cone opsins of a color normal subject.

EnChroma lenses are composed primarily of an optical notch filter that selectively filters wavelengths of light in the part of the spectrum where the M- and L-opsin sensitivities overlap, namely 530-560 nm, thereby removing light that excites both opsin types and decorrelating the signals between the M- and L-cones. EnChroma claims that the notch filter effectively re-separates the spectral sensitivities of the opsins, increasing the dynamic range of the red–green opponent process channel closer to that of color normal subjects, thereby correcting anomalous trichromacy (partial color blindness) and enabling users to distinguish colors they could not distinguish without the glasses. A number of patents have been granted based on the technology.

== Efficacy ==
The efficacy of the lenses is generally not supported by the literature, with some exceptions. However, there is no single measure of efficacy shared by the literature. While the literature often asks whether the lenses "enhance" color, this has no objective meaning and is therefore immeasurable. A proper evaluation of efficacy requires an overview of claimed or potential effects, listed in the table below with an appraisal of the amount of evidence to support that claim.

Claim	Level of Evidence
Correcting color vision (mimicking or simulating normal color vision)	None
Seeing new colors (that are imperceptible without the lenses)	None
Increasing contrast between colors, or Increasing size of a scene's gamut	Low
Improving performance on color vision tests	Medium

The American Optometric Association reports that "Using specially tinted eyeglasses... can increase some people's ability to differentiate between colors, though nothing can make them truly see the deficient color."

The first study to incite popular skepticism of EnChroma was a 2018 study published in Optics Express, where 48 (Note: 62.5% of these were indicated as dichromats according to anomaloscope testing, which are not claimed to gain anything from wearing EnChroma lenses.) colorblind subjects performed the Ishihara test, FM-100 test and a color naming test with and without EnChroma indoor lenses. The results showed no significant improvement to the performance on any of the color vision tests. The study also claimed that only one participant noticed any difference in the colors in the test environment, when prompted, and the results "cast doubt on the real effectiveness these devices have on the color vision of observers with CVD." The study also showed that the mistakes made in the color naming test changed with the lenses on, suggesting that while contrast between some colors increases with the glasses on, it comes at the expense of lower contrast in others, i.e. making some mistakes with the glasses on only. In an attempt to explain some of the emotional reaction used in EnChroma advertisements, the study's lead author stated that "The use of a colored filter may change the appearance of colors, but will never make color vision more similar to a normal observer's vision. It's like turning up the contrast on a TV, which for some people can be startling enough to trigger an emotional reaction."

A study in 2017 involving 23 males aged from 20 to 25 years with normal trichromatic color vision showed that EnChroma Cx-14 lens notches the blue and violet region of the visible spectrum. This induced participants with normal color vision to experience tritan defect when wearing the lens. In a subsequent study, the EnChroma Cx-14 filters did not significantly influence the vision of 10 colorblind subjects and "improved the error score in only two subjects".

A 2020 study of University of California, Davis assessed the glasses' impact on color discrimination, color naming, and color preference tasks in 10 participants. The results indicated that wearing EnChroma glasses led to significant improvements in color discrimination and naming tasks for participants with mild to moderate red–green CVD. However, the glasses did not demonstrate the same level of effectiveness for those with severe CVD. (Note: One of the authors of this study disclosed owning shares in EnChroma at the time of publishing.)

A 2021 article published by the American Academy of Ophthalmology reported that color blindness glasses "change what the people who wear them see, enhancing the distinction between red and green ... but the experience will vary widely among individuals, and these glasses don't give people a true equivalent of natural color vision." The AAO also says that "the positive effects of the glasses last only as long as they are being worn." and that the EnChroma glasses "don't in any way modify a person's photoreceptors, optic nerves or visual cortex to fix colorblindness."

A 2022 meta-analysis concluded that EnChroma lenses show no "clinically significant evidence that subjective color perception has improved. As a result, recommending these color vision devices to the CVD population may not prove high beneficial/be counterproductive."

A 2024 study investigated the effects of EnChroma filters on 10 deuteranomalous trichromats across three areas: color matching, color discrimination, and color appearance. The findings indicated that the filters significantly enhanced color matching in line with predictions, enhancing the color gamut for these individuals. Additionally, significant enhancements were observed in the appearance of colors along the red-green axis, suggesting improved color perception in this spectrum. However, the study noted minimal improvement in color discrimination at threshold levels and notes that its results do not imply EnChroma filters can create "new color experiences".
