= Color blind glasses =

Light filters to alleviate color blindness

Color blind glasses or color correcting lenses are light filters, usually in the form of glasses or contact lenses, that attempt to alleviate color blindness, by bringing deficient color vision closer to normal color vision or to make certain color tasks easier to accomplish. Despite their popularity, academic literature is generally skeptical of the efficacy of color correcting lenses.

== Color blindness ==
A plate from the Ishihara test

Color blindness (color vision deficiency) is the decreased ability to see color or differences in color. It can impair daily color tasks such as selecting ripe fruit or choosing clothing, as well as safety-related tasks such as interpreting traffic lights. While the disability of color blindness is considered minor, the use of color in safety systems excludes the color blind from many occupations. Screening for color blindness in these occupations is accomplished with color vision tests, often the Ishihara test. There is no cure for color blindness, but management of color vision may be possible with apps or color correcting lenses.

== Varieties ==
There are several kinds of lenses that claim to increase accuracy in color-related tasks. The lenses may be eyeglasses, contact lenses or handheld lenses, and may be distinguished according to their working principle. Most lenses are intended for red-green color blindness, though some lenses are also marketed for blue-yellow color blindness. All lenses are passive optical filters, so can only subtract/attenuate selective wavelengths of light. However, there are large variations on this theme:

- Disparate lenses: using different filters over each eye
- Monocular lenses: using a filter on only one eye
- Binocular lenses: using the same filter over both eyes

=== Disparate lenses ===
The idea of using colored filters as color correcting lenses originated from August Seebeck in 1837. In 1857, James Clerk Maxwell constructed red and green glasses according to Seebeck's theory. Seebeck noticed that red and green lenses change the relative luminosity of colors that the red-green colorblind usually saw as metamers and the subjects could thereby estimate the correct color. Based on these results, Maxwell hypothesized that color perception would improve after prolonged exposure to the glasses.

Red-green disparately tinted lenses are not currently commercialized, likely because the resulting color vision is highly distorted (making color-naming tasks difficult) and the different lens colors are not aesthetic. However, a modern Swedish invention called the SeeKey uses red and green lenses to help the user identify colors. The lenses are not worn over the eyes, but are handheld. The user alternates looking between the two lenses and can infer a color by the relative brightness changes between the two lenses and direct vision. For example, red-green colorblind subjects routinely confused green and orange; using the SeeKey, orange would appear lighter through the red filter and darker through the green filter (relative to no filter). Using the lenses during the Ishihara test achieve a 86% improvement. Unlike other color correcting lenses, the SeeKey is not intended to be worn consistently, and is only used when required for a color task.

=== Monocular lenses ===
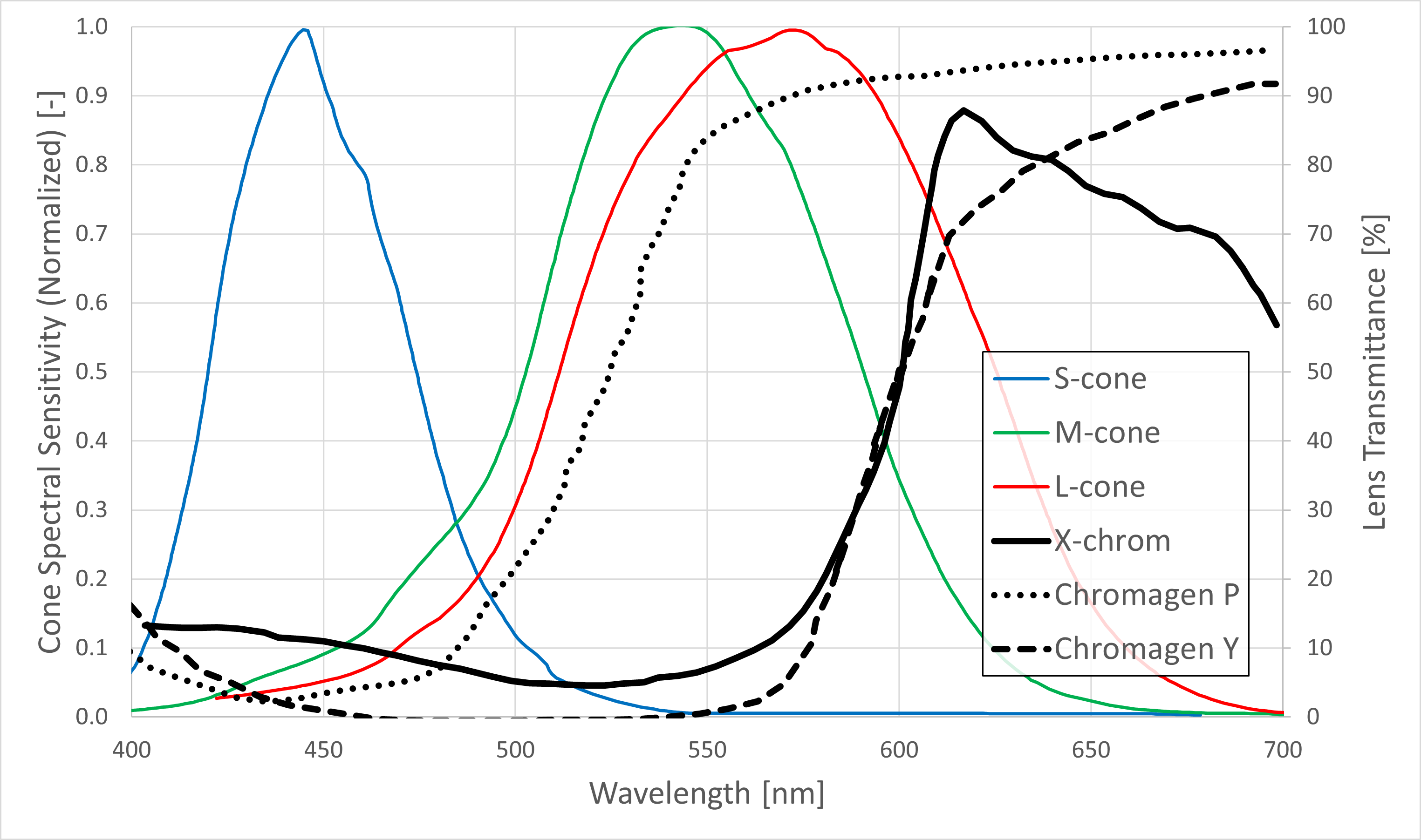
Transmittance of various monocular color correcting lenses superimposed onto the normalized spectral sensitivities of the cone opsins of a color normal observer.

Monocular lenses are usually red-tinted contact lenses worn over a single (the non-dominant) eye. These lenses are intended to leverage binocular disparity to improve discrimination of some colors. Compared to disparate lenses, one eye is left unfiltered in order to preserve a realistic perception of colors. Examples of this technology include X-chrom (1971; manual) and Chromagen (1998).

A 1981 review of various studies to evaluate the effect of the X-chrom contact lens concluded that, while the lens may allow the wearer to achieve a better score on certain color vision tests (specifically pseudoisochromatic plates like the Ishihara test), it did not correct color vision in the natural environment. or practical industry. The improvements in pseudoisochromatic plates is from a selective (for some colors) change in brightness, thereby introducing achromatic contrast to the images, rather than an increase in chromatic contrast. In fact, despite the claim of binocular disparity leading to color vision improvements, Ishihara test results actually improved when the dominant (unfiltered) eye was covered during the test.

Although still on the market, monocular filters are considered obsolete, since they lead to reduced visual acuity, changes in apparent velocity perception, visual distortions (such as the Pulfrich effect) and an impairment of depth perception. These side effects can make monocular lenses a liability when intended as a solution to color blindness.

=== Binocular lenses ===
Binocular lenses apply the same filter to both eyes. They do not use binocular disparity (like monocular lenses) or temporal disparity (like the SeeKey) to extract information about color. There are two types of binocular filters, classified by the shape of their transmittance curves.

==== Tinted filters ====
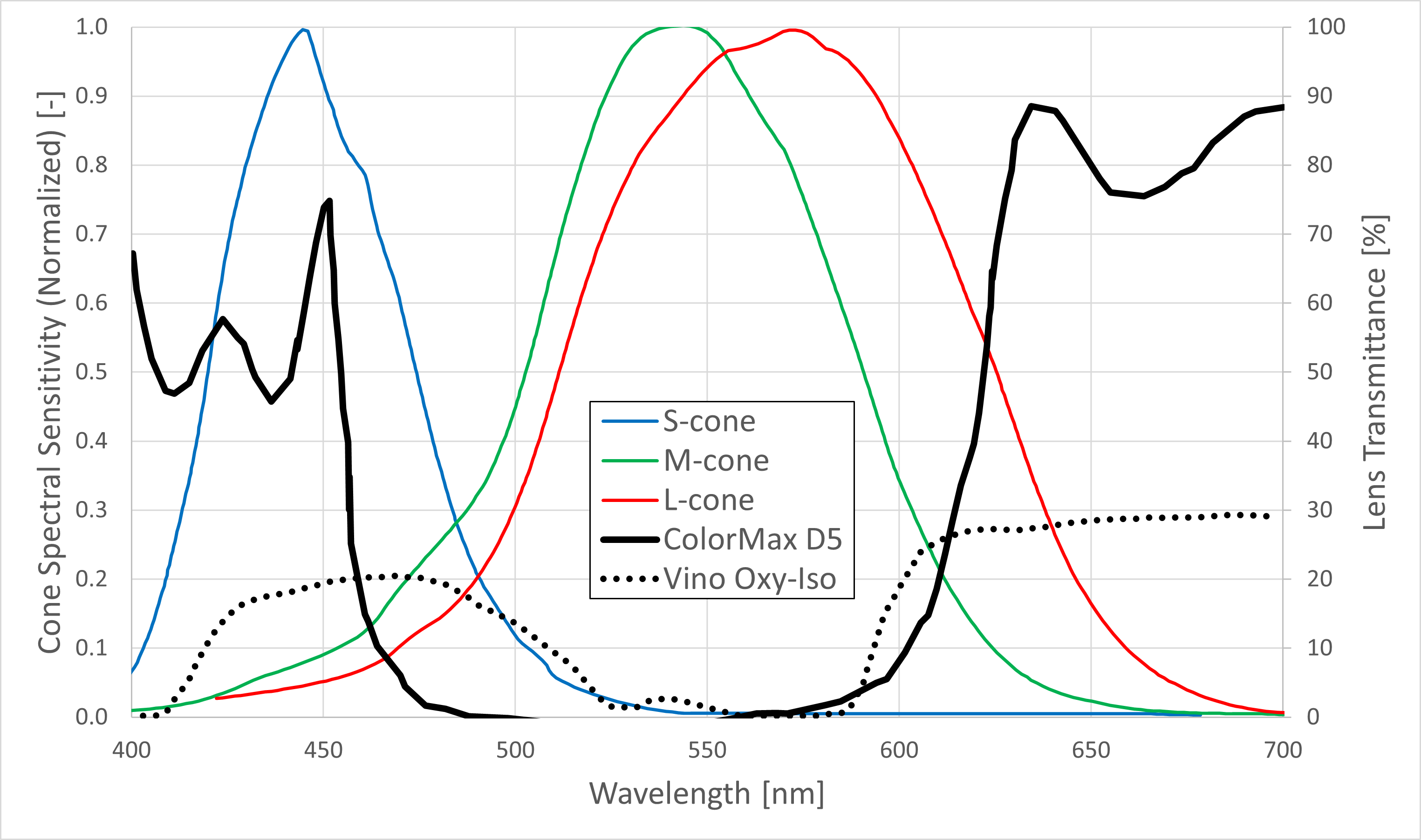
Transmittance of tinted color correcting lenses (Vino and ColorMax) superimposed onto the normalized spectral sensitivities of the cone opsins of a color normal observer.

Tinted lenses (e.g. Pilestone/Colorlite/ColorMax glasses) apply a tint (e.g. magenta) to incoming light that can distort colors in a way that makes some color tasks easier to complete. These glasses can circumvent many colorblind tests, though wearing them during testing is typically not allowed.

The transmittance of these filters have a cutoff near the peak wavelength of one of the opsin's spectral sensitivities, which can effectively shift the peak wavelength to higher or lower wavelengths. Since anomalous trichromacy (protanomaly and deuteranomaly) result from the peak wavelengths of two opsin classes being too close together on the spectrum, shifting them apart is claimed to improve color vision.

A 2010 assessment of several tinted filters showed no useful color enhancement as determined by the D-15 test or a practical test involving traffic light colors (similar to the FALANT). They described that the lenses "should be considered dangerous in a traffic environment."

==== Notch filters ====
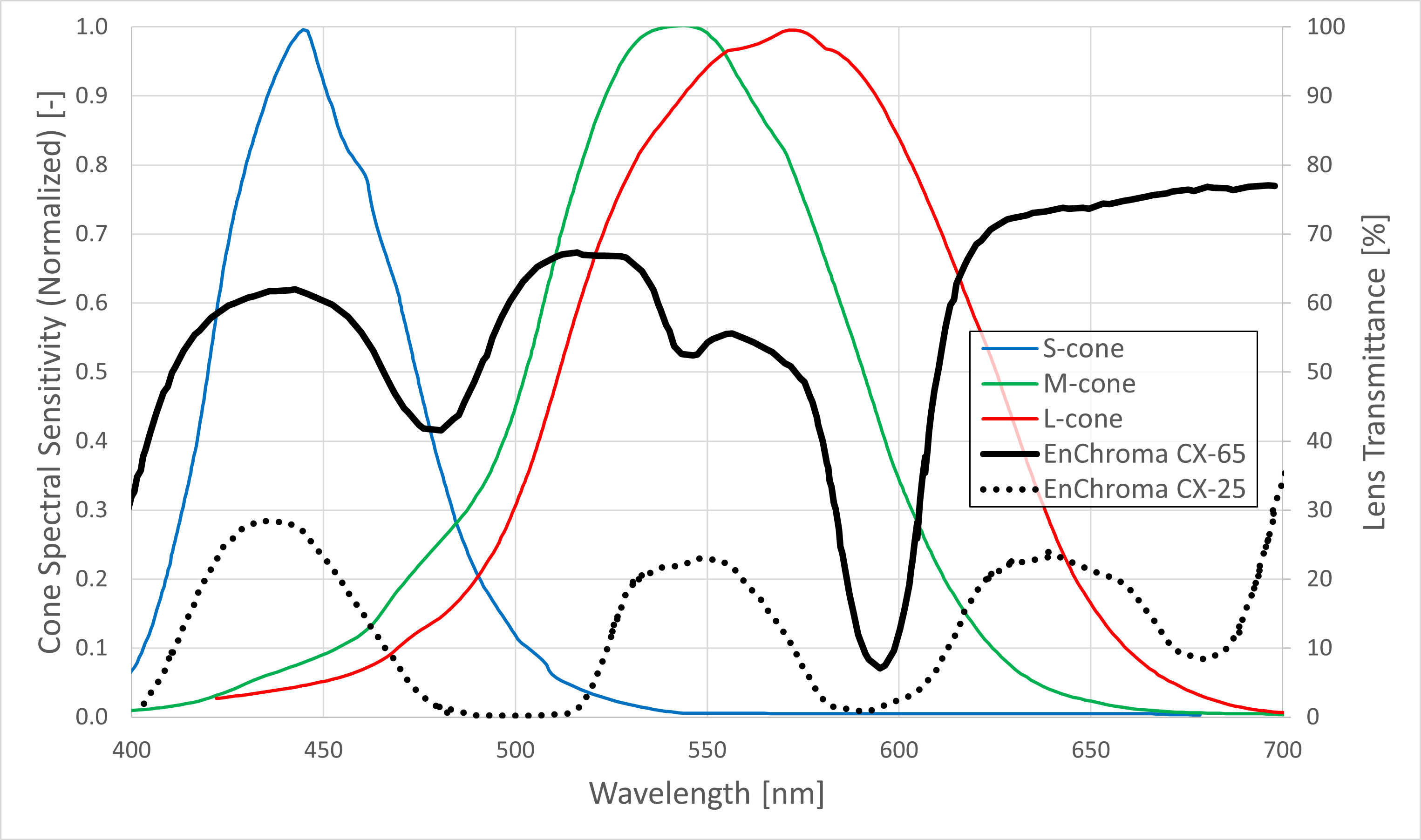
Transmittance of EnChroma color correcting lenses (indoor and outdoor) superimposed onto the normalized spectral sensitivities of the cone opsins of a color normal observer.

Glasses with a notch filter (e.g. EnChroma glasses) filter a narrow band of light around 590 nm that excites both the L- and M-cones (yellow-green wavelengths). They are often combined with an additional stopband in the short wavelength (blue) region to minimize the tint on the lenses and approximate a neutral-density filter. They improve on the other lens types by causing less distortion of colors. The effect is an increase in saturation of some colors (depending on the underlying spectra), which many users explain as certain colors "popping". EnChroma glasses come in indoor and outdoor varieties that differ on how much light they block.

Lenses with notch filters only work on trichromats (anomalous or normal), and unlike some other types of lenses, do not have a significant effect on Dichromats. However, special vision testing or genetic testing is required for the differential diagnosis of dichromats and trichromats, so it is usually not performed.

Several studies conducted on the efficacy of EnChroma glasses have shown no improvement on traditional color vision tests (Ishihara, FM-100, CAD). Other studies have shown slight improvements in Ishihara and D-15 tests, but attributes these to an introduction of luminous contrast. Recent research indicates that long term use of EnChroma glasses may have a positive impact on color perception, even when the glasses are removed. The authors suggest that "modifications of photoreceptor signals activate a plastic post-receptoral substrate that could potentially be exploited for visual rehabilitation".

== Marketing ==
When X-chrom lenses—the first therapeutic color correcting lenses—were introduced in 1971, interest in the device was bolstered by false claims that the lenses could cure color blindness. At the time, the FDA had little power to regulate false claims regarding medical devices. In 1976, the FDA was granted this power with the Medical Device Regulation Act, but the X-chrom lenses still remained outside of their jurisdiction as they were not classified as medical devices. When ColorMax notified the FDA of their new color corrective lenses in 1998, the FDA enacted restrictions on the marketing that ColorMax could use:

- No insinuations that the lenses would make the colorblind see in "normal color".
- No claiming FDA approval (notification is not approval and does not connote a validation of the technology).
- Must mention that any benefits to some color discrimination is at the expense of other colors.

All of these restrictions would then also be enforced on subsequent color correcting lenses that would want to use the ColorMax (or X-Chrom) as a predicate medical device. Using a predicate device makes the regulatory pathway much easier.

Viral videos centered on colorblind individuals trying color correcting glasses for the first time and having emotional reactions are very common and many lens producers have relied on this viral marketing. While the producers themselves are barred from making the above claims, false claims made in viral social media posts/videos by users of the lenses are unregulated. In 2016, a marketing company affiliated with EnChroma won a marketing award for best use of viral marketing. One YouTuber, Logan Paul, admitted to embellishing his reaction to trying EnChroma glasses in his vlog. Still others have criticized the use of viral, emotional marketing as a way to distract from the "negative scientific news" towards glasses.

== Legality ==
A 1978 study by the FAA looked at the "aeromedical" implications of the X-chrom lens, finding that the lenses increased scores in pseudoisochromatic plates without increasing performance in practical tests (e.g. aviation signal light gun test). They subsequently banned the use of X-chrom lenses during tests. Today, most occupational screening for colorblindness have explicit bans on either the use of X-chrom lenses specifically or all color correcting lenses in general.

== Similar concepts ==
This section contains similar applications for color correcting lenses and alternative tools for improving color vision.

=== Achromatopsia ===
Achromatopsia is a vision disorder with symptoms that include total color blindness, i.e. a complete lack of color vision. While there is no lens that claims to grant achromats color vision, lenses are an important part of achromatopsia management. For example, another symptom of achromatopsia is photophobia, which makes it difficult to see in bright light. Strongly tinted sun glasses or contact lenses are often used to decrease luminosity. Red-tinted lenses are very common, but different hues are used to optimize the comfort of the wearer.

Achromats often use red filters while driving to help identify traffic lights when position cues are not sufficient. Similar to the operation of the SeeKey, modulating a red filter will allow the driver to use differences in brightness to determine which light is on.

=== Smart Glasses ===
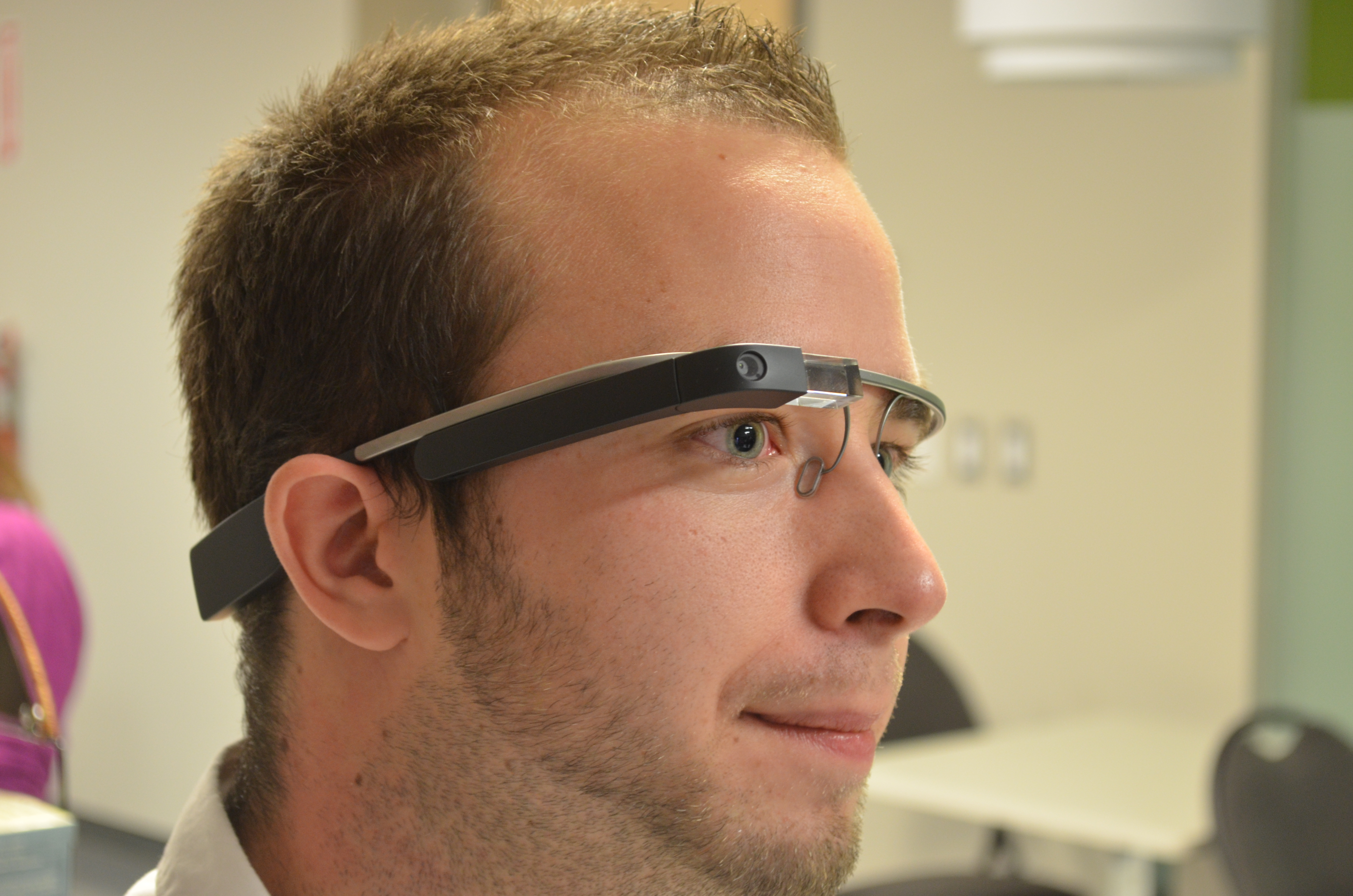
Google Glass has been used with daltonization filters to create a sort of "active" color correcting lens

The color correcting lenses discussed above are all passive filters, and can therefore only subtract light at certain wavelengths. However, active lenses, which are also able to amplify light at certain wavelengths, are much more flexible in how they can 'correct' color vision and impose bigger shifts of color. Smart glasses like the Google Glass and Epson Moverio can act like active lenses and have been used with re-coloring apps to help the colorblind with color tasks. Digital re-coloring filters are usually based on Daltonization algorithms that re-color the image regardless of the content, but smart glasses can also be context-aware and adapt to different scenes to optimize the filter. For example, they could increase the contrast between brown and pink when specifically cooking red meat. These active lenses are a type of augmented reality.

=== Lenses to simulate color blindness ===
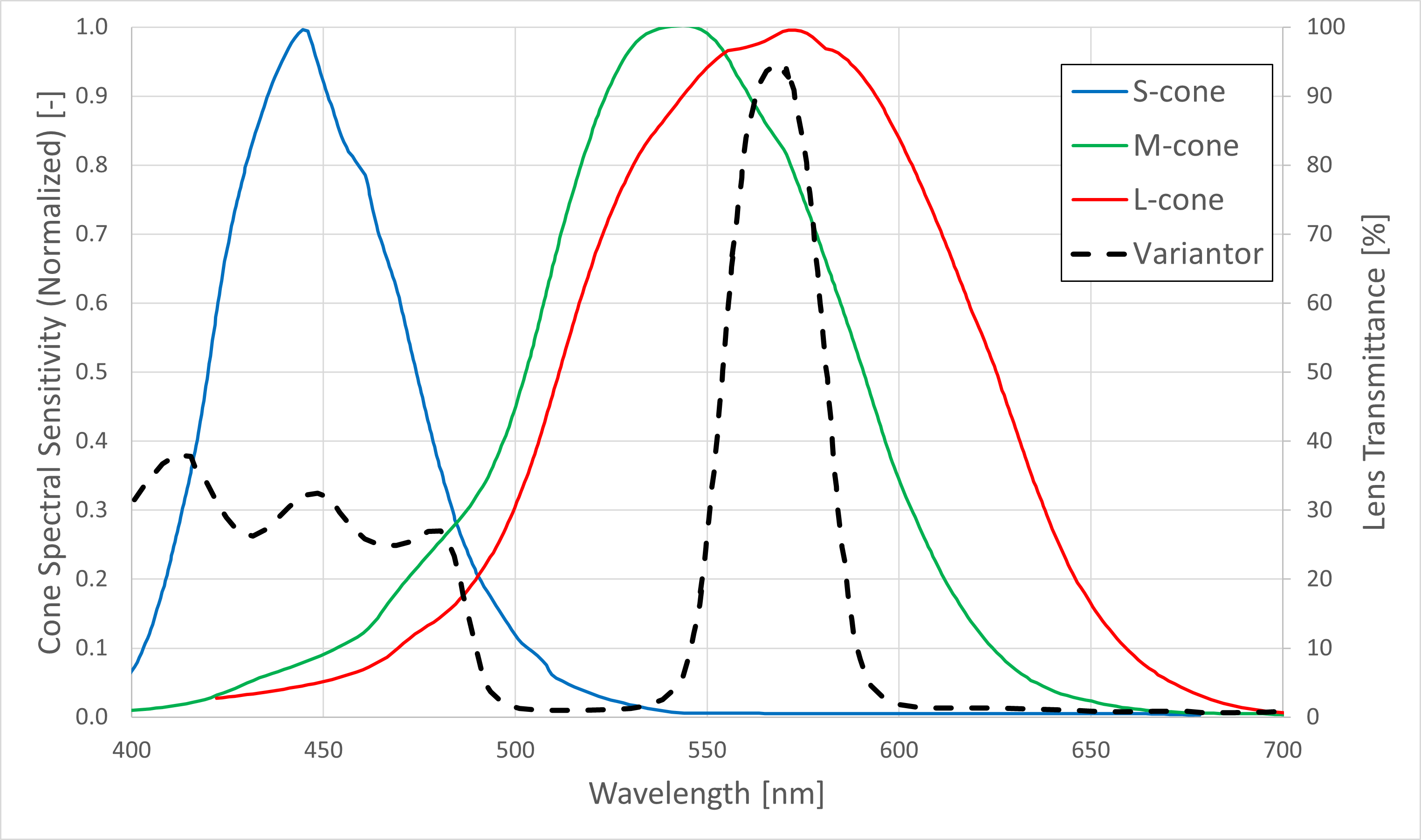
Transmittance of the Variantor colorblind simulation lens superimposed onto the normalized spectral sensitivities of the cones.

The opposite of color correcting lenses are lenses that simulate color blindness, i.e. worsen the color vision of color normals. One example are Variantor lenses, which exhibit a cyan tint. The transmittance of the filter of the Variantor lens follows the opposite principle of color correcting lenses with notch filters. The lens' filter allows wavelengths of light to pass that either do not significantly excite the L- and M-opsins, (short wavelength pass band <490 nm) or that excite them equally (long wavelength pass band ~ 560 nm). When plotted over the spectral sensitivities of the cone opsins, the transmittance maximum may appear to "miss" the point where the M- and L-opsins intersect, but this is just an artefact of the normalization. When de-normalized, the point of equal excitation will be closer to the maximum transmittance since most observers have M-cones which are more sensitive than L-cones. The effect is an accurate representation of protanopia.

=== Dyslexia ===
Color correcting lenses have also been used as an aid in alleviating Dyslexia, a disorder hindering a subject's ability to read. In 2001, the company that made Chromagen lenses for color vision deficiency also claimed that the same lenses led to an "enhancement of reading rate in patients with reading disorders related to distortion of text."

The passage was based on a 1996 study that claimed that color overlays on text (such as looking through a tinted lens) could generate a large and immediate effect on reading speed. The FDA denied that the study supported the claim of reading-rate enhancement, but allowed a reduced claim of "relief of visual discomfort while reading" due to subjects in the study consistently rating "ease of reading" higher with the Chromagen lenses than with placebo lenses.

A recent systematic literature review on tinted lenses used as dyslexia aids came to the same conclusions, stating that their use "to ameliorate reading difficulties cannot be endorsed and that any benefits reported by individuals in clinical settings are likely to be the result of placebo, practice or Hawthorne effects."
