= Color task =

Task that involves the recognition of color

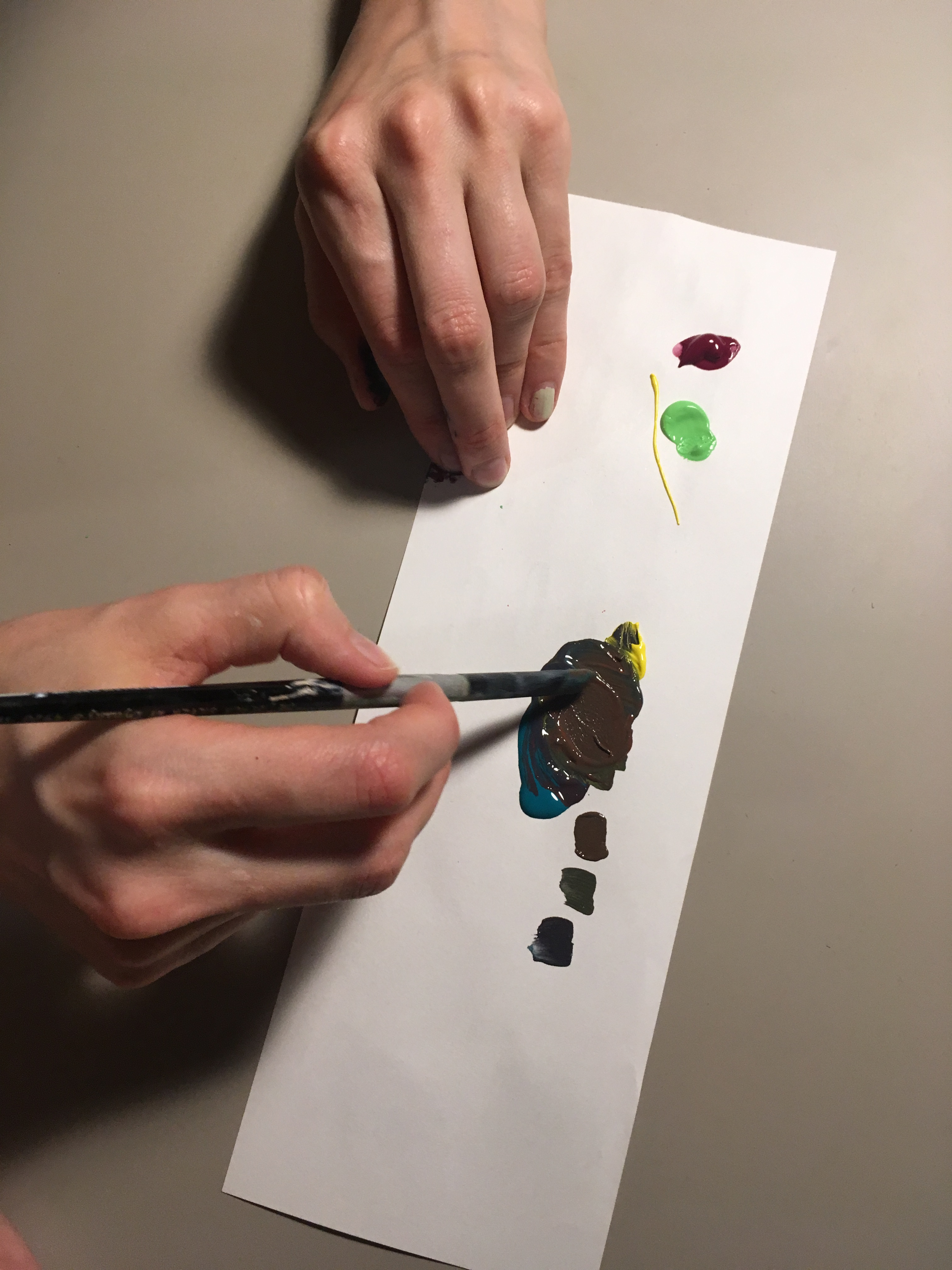
Mixing paint to match a desired color is a type of comparative color task

Color tasks are tasks that involve the recognition of colors. Color tasks can be classified according to how the color is interpreted. Barry Cole describes four categories of color tasks:

- Comparative – When multiple colors must be compared, such as with mixing paint
- Connotative – When colors are given an implicit meaning, such as red = stop
- Denotative – When identifying colors, for example by name, such as “where is the yellow ball?”
- Aesthetic – When colors look nice – or convey an emotional response – but don’t carry explicit meaning

Earlier classification of color tasks did not attempt to be comprehensive, and mainly differentiated between color matching/ordering, pseudoisochromatic plates and color-naming. In Cole's definitions, the latter would be denotative color tasks and the others would be comparative color tasks.

== Color blindness ==
Color blindness (or color vision deficiency) is a defect of normal color vision. Because color blindness is a symptom of several genetic and acquired conditions, the severity can range drastically from monochromacy (no color vision) to anomalous trichromacy (can be as mild as being indistinguishable from normal color vision). Congenital (genetic) color blindness causes difficulty in all four kinds of color tasks. However, cerebral color blindness may cause issues only in some types of color tasks, and other conditions that do not affect color vision can still affect color vision tasks (e.g. anomia).

== Comparative ==
Pseudoisochromatic plate; solving it requires a comparative color task, namely distinguishing the green foreground (the letter "W") from the red background

Comparative color tasks require a subject to differentiate two colors. Simple examples include many color vision tests, which are specifically modeled as comparative tasks. For example, the Ishihara test and other pseudoisochromatic plates require a direct comparison (and therefore discrimination) of foreground and background colors to be able to read the embedded number/character.

Arrangement tests such as the Farnsworth D-15 also requires comparison of adjacent colors to be able to arrange them in a meaningful spectrum. In addition to being able to distinguish two colors, arrangement tests also require measuring color difference and decision making based on this parameter. Despite the increased complexity of this task, they were not differentiated by Cole, though were by others.

Comparative tasks are the "purest" tasks that rely almost solely on color perception without interference of linguistics, culture or memory. Sometimes, color blindness derived from brain damage (such as cerebral achromatopsia) can affect the other color tasks while leaving the comparative color tasks untouched.

Other examples of comparative color tasks include:

- Distinguishing red fruits from green foliage
- Paint mixing
- Reading colored data with legends
- Painting/drawing realistic subjects

== Connotative ==
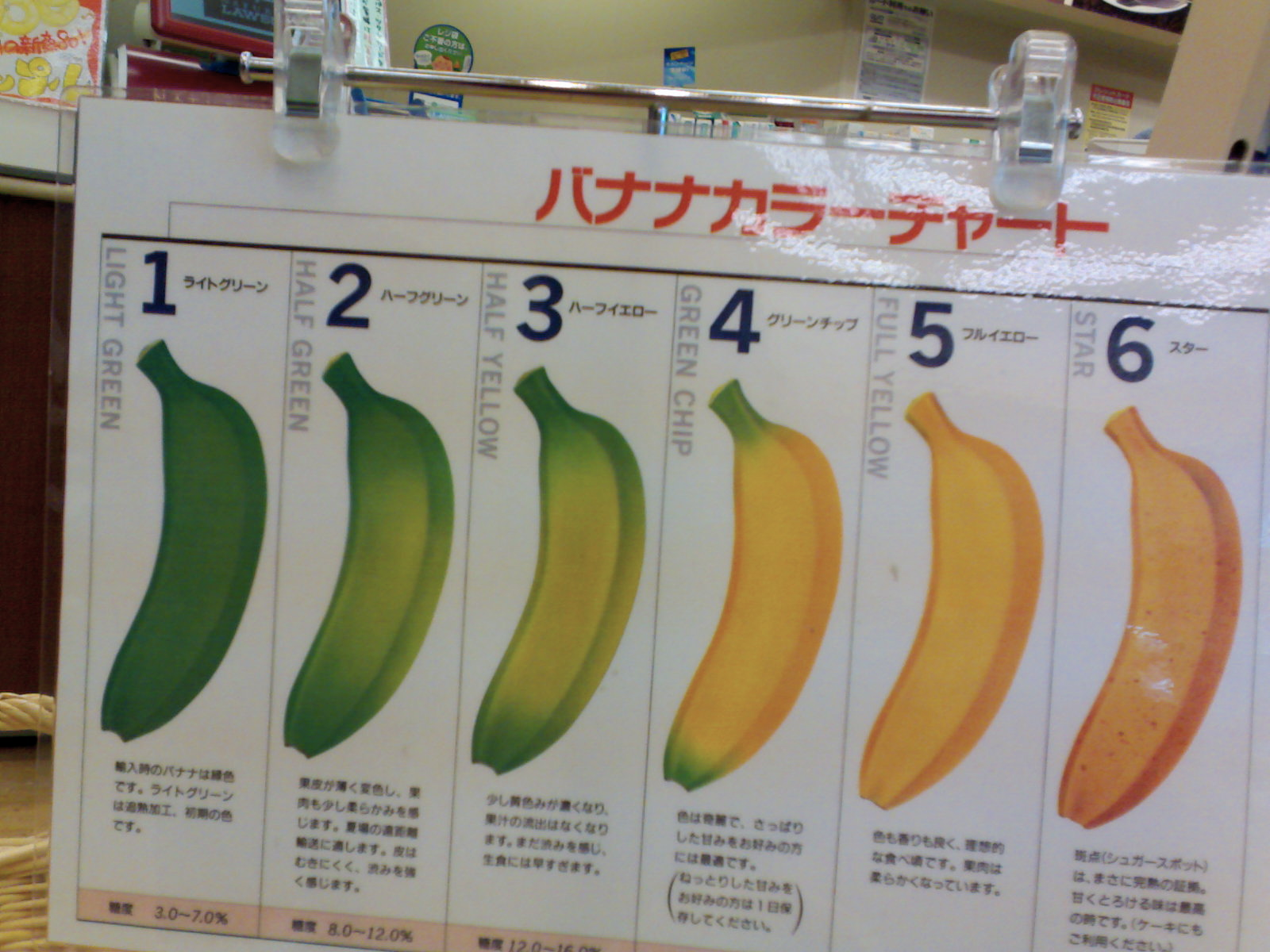
Banana ripeness scale; identifying the ripeness through color is a connotative color task.

Connotative color tasks require the subject to infer implicit information from a color. In addition to color vision, connotative color tasks require either cultural or natural knowledge to interpret the color's meaning.

An example of a connotative color task based on cultural meaning are traffic lights, which require the test taker to not only recognize the color, but also to interpret the meaning of the color (red means stop). Examples of connotative color tasks based on natural meaning are interpretation of skin tone (blushing, sunburn, pallor, etc.) and interpretation of food edibility (ripeness, doneness, etc.).

== Denotative ==
Describing colors by their color terms is a denotative color task

Generally, in order to communicate colors, they must first be converted into a meaningful color term or description. Anything that requires this conversion, either from color to description (color naming) or vice versa, is a denotative color task. Denotative color tasks involve both color perception and linguistics. Aphasia or color anomia can also lead to a failure to perform denotative color tasks even when color vision is normal. Some color vision tests comprise denotative tasks, such as lantern tests, which require the subject to name the colors of lights.

== Aesthetic ==
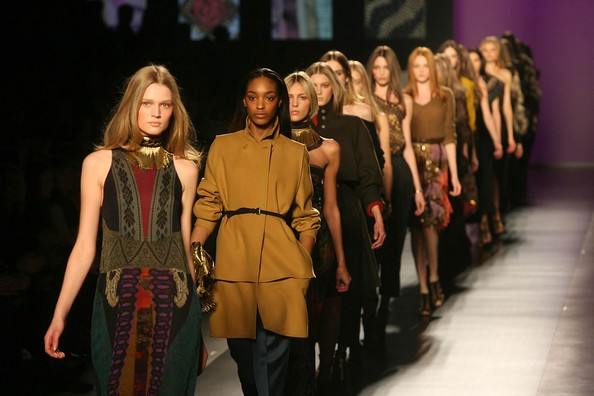
Fashion Design requires completion of aesthetic color tasks.

Aesthetic color tasks require aesthetic judgments of colors, usually in terms of color harmony, where color combinations can be selected to be pleasing or flattering. Alternatively, colors can be selected for their evocative qualities (such as warmth or coolness). Aesthetic color tasks are necessary in architecture, interior decoration, graphic design, advertising, matching clothes, abstract art, and other applications. Aesthetic tasks are not generally tested for, since aesthetic tasks are highly subjective.

== See also ==
- City University test
- Color agnosia
- Color anomia
