= Cerebral achromatopsia =

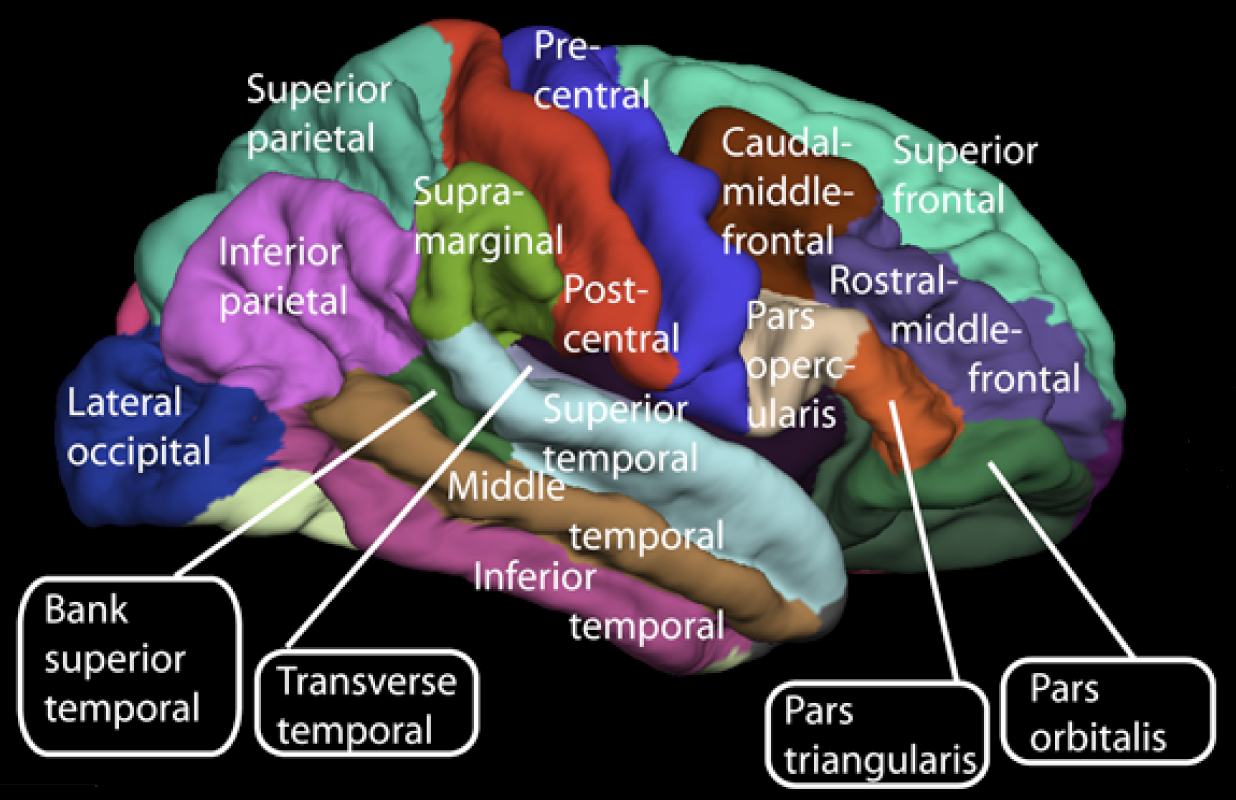
- Lateral surface of cerebral cortex
- Specialty: Neurology

Cerebral achromatopsia is a type of color blindness caused by damage to the cerebral cortex of the brain, rather than abnormalities in the cells of the eye's retina. It is often confused with congenital achromatopsia but the underlying physiological deficits of the disorders are completely distinct. A similar, but distinct, deficit called color agnosia exists in which a person has intact color perception (as measured by a matching task) but has deficits in color recognition, such as knowing which color they are looking at.

== Signs and symptoms ==
Patients with cerebral achromatopsia deny having any experience of color when asked and fail standard clinical assessments like the Farnsworth-Munsell 100-hue test (a test of color ordering with no naming requirements). Patients may often not notice their loss of color vision and merely describe the world they see as being "drab". Most describe seeing the world in "shades of gray". This observation notes a key difference between cerebral and congenital achromatopsia, as those born with achromatopsia have never had an experience of color or gray.

== Pathophysiology ==
Cerebral achromatopsia differs from other forms of color blindness in subtle but important ways. It is a consequence of cortical damage that arises through ischemia or infarction of a specific area in the ventral occipitotemporal cortex of humans. This damage is almost always the result of injury or illness.

=== Classification ===
A 2005 study examined 92 case studies since 1970 in which cerebral lesions affected color vision. The severity and size of the visual field affected in those with cerebral achromatopsia vary from patient to patient.

==== Bilateral and hemifield ====
The majority of cases in the 2005 study were the result of bilateral lesions in the ventral occipital cortex. It is unknown whether this was the result of bilateral lesions being more likely to produce color-loss symptoms, or if it was a sampling effect of patients with more severe brain trauma more often being admitted for treatment. In many of the cases examined, patients reported only partial loss of color vision. The locations of color vision loss can be restricted to one hemisphere or one quarter of the visual field. The term "hemiachromatopsia" has been used to denote patients who experience loss of color in only one hemisphere of the visual field. However, as applied to achromatopia resulting from brain trauma, the term is incomplete in characterizing the often-complex nature of the vision loss.

==== Transient ====
In still rarer cases, temporary ischemia of the associated ventral occipital cortex can result in transient achromatopsia. The condition has thus far been characterized only in stroke patients and provides further support for a color processing area.

In one case, a 78-year-old stroke victim had lost the ability to identify color, but was unaware of his deficit until doctors performed color discretion tests. Even when presented with this information, the patient believed he had retained his ability to perceive color even though the world around him appeared grey. He attributed this achromatism to "poor lighting" and it took several weeks for the patient to fully appreciate the extent of his disability. In addition, the characteristic comorbidity of prosopagnosia was present. After two months and frequent sessions with doctors, tests indicated his color had fully returned. The ischemia caused by lesions on the posterior cerebral arteries had subsided and follow up MRI scans indicated that blood flow had once again returned to the ventral occipital cortex.

=== Co-occurrence with other deficits ===
The most common disorder seen alongside cerebral achromatopsia is prosopagnosia, the inability to recognize or recall faces. In some studies, the comorbidity is seen as high as 72%. This significance has not been overlooked and is a subject of ongoing research.

Cerebral achromatopes often have poor spatial acuity.

== Diagnosis ==
Cerebral achromatopsia can be diagnosed easily with color vision tests, commonly the Farnsworth-Munsell 100 hue test or the Ishihara plate test. Testing and diagnosis for cerebral achromatopsia is often incomplete and misdiagnosed in doctor's offices.

Remarkably, almost 50% of tested patients diagnosed with cerebral achromatopsia are able to perform normally on the color-naming test. However, these results are somewhat in question because of the sources from which many of these reports come. Only 29% of cerebral achromatopsia patients successfully pass the Ishihara plate test, which is a more accepted and more standardized test for color blindness.

=== Difference from congenital achromatopsia ===
The most apparent distinguishing characteristic between congenital achromatopsia and cerebral achromatopsia is the sudden onset of color vision loss following a severe head injury or damage to the occipital lobe following a stroke or similar ischemic event. Non-invasive imaging techniques can be the most helpful in determining whether the area of damage following a traumatic event is correlated with color-vision processing. Simple diagnostic tools can also be used to determine whether a patient is a likely candidate for further testing, as advancing imaging procedures can often prove expensive and unnecessary.

Co-morbid factors can be valuable indicators of the likelihood of cerebral achromatopsia. One disorder often seen alongside cerebral achromatopsia is prosopagnosia, the inability to recall or recognize faces. The correlation is still the subject of ongoing research, but the most telltale clue in this association is the close proximity of brain lesions seen in prosopagnosics and those with cerebral achromatopsia without prosopagnosia. Figure 1 illustrates overlap of brain lesions compiled from numerous case reports of both disorders. A common area of damage associated with both disorders can be seen in the right occipital lobe.

== Treatment ==
No current treatment is known for the disorder.

== History ==
The number of reported cases of cerebral achromatopsia are relatively few compared with other forms of color-vision loss. In addition, the severity of the color perception deficits along with other psychological effects vary between patients. A case of cerebral achromatopsia, acquired after a cortical lesion, was described by Dr. Verrey in 1888. but the evidence was dismissed by both Gordon Holmes and Salomon Henschen, two eminent neurologists who had identified the position and limits of the primary visual cortex. Verrey's description all but disappeared until a color center was identified in macaque monkey. and until a review of the literature showed the common location of the rare cases of cerebral achromatopsia

== Current research ==
Based on the knowledge gained from cerebral achromatopsia case studies, current research is focusing on learning more about the cortical area involved in color processing.

A recent study provided some of the first direct evidence of color-specific processing in the human ventral occipital cortex. A subject with a history of seizure activity was examined using fMRI and electrode implantation. Using the fMRI, researchers examined the areas of blood oxygenation in the occipital lobe as the subject viewed various color-specific stimuli. The result of the experiment was the identification of an area in the subject, slightly anterior to the lesioned area in cerebral achromatic patients, that responded to variance in color stimulation. The resolution of the MRI was a limiting factor in identifying areas corresponding to specific colors. The next portion of the study used an electrode implanted in the right hemisphere in the location identified by the fMRI scan as pertaining to color processing. It was found the electrical activity of the area increased when the subject was presented with blue stimuli. The next, and most significant finding of the study, was that when the electrode was used to present an electrical stimulus in the subject's brain, the subject reported the perception of the color blue. Such a result is consistent with other reports of electrical stimulation in visual field maps eliciting perception of phosphines in subjects' visual field.

The color stimulus presented is not the only factor in determining the involvement of the ventral occipital cortex in color processing. The amount of attention and the type of object also affect the activation of the ventral occipital cortex. It has been noted that this area of the occipital lobe may not be a processing center but rather a pathway that is a critical intersection of several cortical areas involved in color perception.

== Society and culture ==
The disorder is often presented as evidence of our incomplete knowledge of color processing. Color vision research is a well-studied field of modern neuroscience and the underlying anatomical processing in the retina have been well categorized. The presence of another factor in the perception of color by humans illustrates the need for more research.

=== The case of the colorblind painter ===
The most famous instance of cerebral achromatopsia is that of "Jonathan I." immortalized in a case study by Oliver Sacks and Robert Wasserman, and published as "The Case of the Colorblind Painter". The essay tracks Johnathan I.'s experience with cerebral achromatopsia from the point where an injury to his occipital lobe leaves him without the ability to perceive color, through his subsequent struggles to adapt to a black, white and gray world, and finally to his acceptance and even gratitude for his condition. Especially pertinent is the analysis of how cerebral achromatopsia affects his practice as a painter and artist. Descriptions of cerebral achromatopsia's effects on his psychological health and visual perception are especially striking. For instance, in recounting Mr. I.'s descriptions of flesh and foods, the authors write:

Mr. I. could hardly bear the changed appearances of people ("like animated gray statues") any more than he could bear his own changed appearance in the mirror: he shunned social intercourse and found sexual intercourse impossible. He saw people's flesh, his wife's flesh, his own flesh, as an abhorrent gray; "flesh-colored" now appeared "rat-colored" to him. This was so even when he closed his eyes, for his preternaturally vivid ("eidetic") visual imagery was preserved but now without color, and forced on him images, forced him to "see" but see internally with the wrongness of his achromatopsia. He found foods disgusting in their grayish, dead appearance and had to close his eyes to eat. But this did not help very much, for the mental image of a tomato was as black as its appearance.

== See also ==
- Achromatopsia
- Cortical blindness
- Color blindness
- Ishihara color test
