= Willibald Nagel =

German physiologist

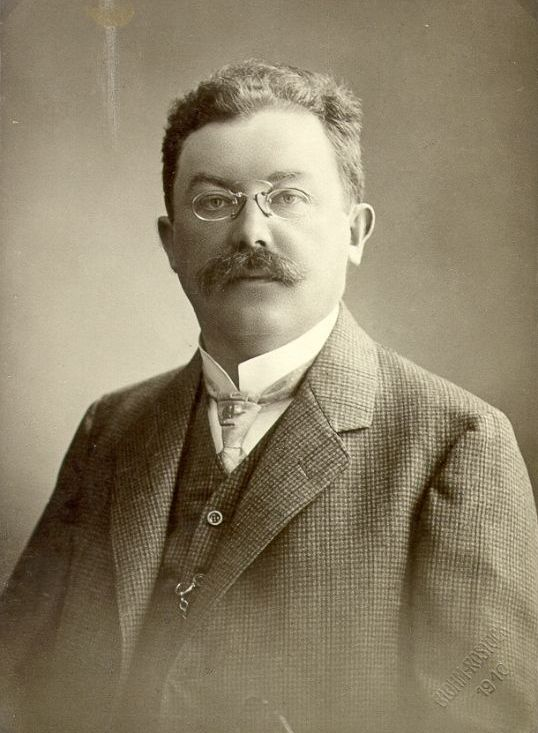
Willibald Nagel in 1910.

Willibald Nagel (19 June 1870 – 13 November 1911) was a German physiologist, best known for his work in the field of sensory physiology.

Born in Tübingen, Nagel earned doctorates in sciences (1892) and medicine (1893), obtaining his habilitation two years later at the University of Freiburg as an assistant to physiologist Johannes von Kries. In 1902 he became an associate professor in Berlin, where he was appointed head of the sensory physiology department in the institute of physiology. In 1908 he was named professor of physiology at the University of Rostock.

His primary areas of work involved physiological optics, physiology in regards to sense of smell and taste, studies of position and motion sensations and the physiology of the vocal organs, to name a few. He is best remembered for the development of ophthalmic instruments and aids—he built an adaptometer for measuring dark adaptation of the eyes, an anomaloscope for the study of color blindness, and introduced the so-called Nagelschen Farbtäfelchen (Nagel's color tablet) for the testing of color perception.

With Hermann Ebbinghaus, he was co-editor of the journal Zeitschrift für psychologie und physiologie der sinnesorgane.

He died in Rostock.

== Associated eponym ==
- Nagel's test: a test for color vision in which the observer determines the relative amounts of red and green in order to match spectral yellow.

== Published works ==
He was the author of the popular Handbuch der Physiologie des Menschen (Handbook of Human Physiology), published in five volumes from 1904 to 1910. The following are a few of his many writings involving physiology of the senses:

- Die niederen Sinne der Insekten (The Lower Senses of Insects), 1892.
- Tafeln zur Diagnose der Farbenblindheit (Table for Diagnosis of Color Blindness), 1898.
- Die Lage-, Bewegungs- und Widerstandsempfindungen (Position, Movement and Resistance Sensations), 1904.
- Allgemeine Einleitung zur Physiologie der Sinne (General Introduction to Sensory Physiology), 1904.
- Methoden zur erforschung des licht- und farbensinns (Methods for the Exploration of Light and Color Perception), 1908.
