= Gordon Lynn Walls =

American biologist, physiologist and optometrist

- Born: April 4, 1905; Malden, Massachusetts, U.S.
- Died: August 22, 1962 (aged 57); Berkeley, California, U.S.
- Known for: Physiology and evolution of the eye
- Scientific career
- Fields: physiological optics
- Workplaces: University of California, Berkeley

Gordon Lynn Walls (April 4, 1905 – August 22, 1962) was an American professor of physiological optics and optometry at the University of California, Berkeley

== Biography ==
Walls started his education at Boston English High School. He earned his B.S. as a mechanical engineer in 1926 at Tufts College. In addition he was an undergraduate in biology and was awarded both the Goddard Prize and the Olmsted Scholarship in Biology. Walls decided not to pursue his career in engineering. Instead he entered Harvard on a graduate scholarship. His first studies dealt with photomechanical changes in the retina, laying the fundaments of his career in vision. He continued his study of the retina as a graduate student (Sc.D. in zoology, 1931) and postdoctoral fellow (1931 to 1934, Alfred G. Lloyd and National Research Council Fellowships) at the University of Michigan and as an associate in zoology at the State University of Iowa from 1934 to 1937.

His interest in vision was confirmed during a four-year research associateship in ophthalmology at Wayne University College of Medicine and culminated with the publication in 1942 of his book The Vertebrate Eye and its Adaptive Radiation. This 785-page classic contains about 200 illustrations, many of which Gordon Walls drew himself. In 1946 he joined the Faculty of the School of Optometry at the University of California. He came to Berkeley as an associate professor of physiological optics and optometry and lecturer in physiology. He also taught courses in morphology and physiology of the eye, physiological optics, evolution of the visual system, and color vision. He was appointed professor in 1952. Walls died of a heart attack in 1962.

== Scientific contributions ==
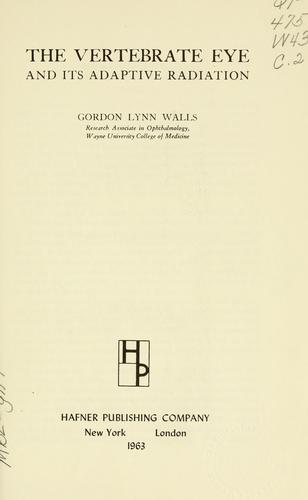
Cover of Gordon Lynn Walls' magnum opus, 1942 (ed. 1963)

In 1942 Walls published The Vertebrate Eye and its Adaptive Radiation a classic on eye physiology and evolution. In this book Walls described a diversity of rod cells and cone cells in the animal world. He detected the communalities of photoreceptor cells in the vertebrate eye and was first in describing the rod cell as a specialized cell, obviously evolved from an early cone cell. He described the nocturnal bottleneck hypothesis which states that placental mammals were mainly or even exclusively nocturnal through most of their evolutionary story, starting with their origin 225 million years ago, and only ending with the demise of the dinosaurs 66 million years ago.

In 1958 Walls wrote a chapter in The eye in evolution, the first volume (780 pages) of Stewart Duke-Elder's work System of Ophthalmology, a monumental multivolume contribution to medical literature. In all, he published more than sixty journal papers and monographs, one book, and chapters to three other books.
