= City University test =

Test used to detect color vision deficiency

City university test
- Specialty: Ophthalmology optometry
- ICD-9-CM: 95.06
- MeSH: D003119

The City University test (also known as TCU test or CU test) is a color vision test used to detect color vision deficiency. Unlike commonly used Ishihara test, City University test can be used to detect all types of color vision defects.

== Description ==
The commonly used Ishihara test is used to detect mainly congenital red-green color blindness, but its usefulness is limited in detecting acquired color vision deficiencies. But City University test contains test plates that can be used to detect all types of color vision deficiencies. The TCU test was derived from Farnsworth D15 color arrangement test. The test consists of 10 plates, containing a central colored dot surrounded by four peripheral dots of different colors. The subject is asked to choose the dot closest to the central hue. Among the four peripheral dots, three peripheral colors are designed in such a way that, it makes confusion with the central color in protan, deutan and tritan deficiency. The fourth color is an adjacent color in D-15 sequence and that would be most similar to the central color.

== Procedure ==
In a well illuminated room, hold the test plates at about 35 cm from patient. Show the test plates and ask the patient to mention which dot is identical to central dot. Allow about 3 seconds for each page. In response to the scores noted in score sheet abnormality can be detected.

== See also ==
- Color vision
- Color vision deficiency
