= Shinobu Ishihara =

Japanese ophthalmologist (1879–1963)

- 石原 忍
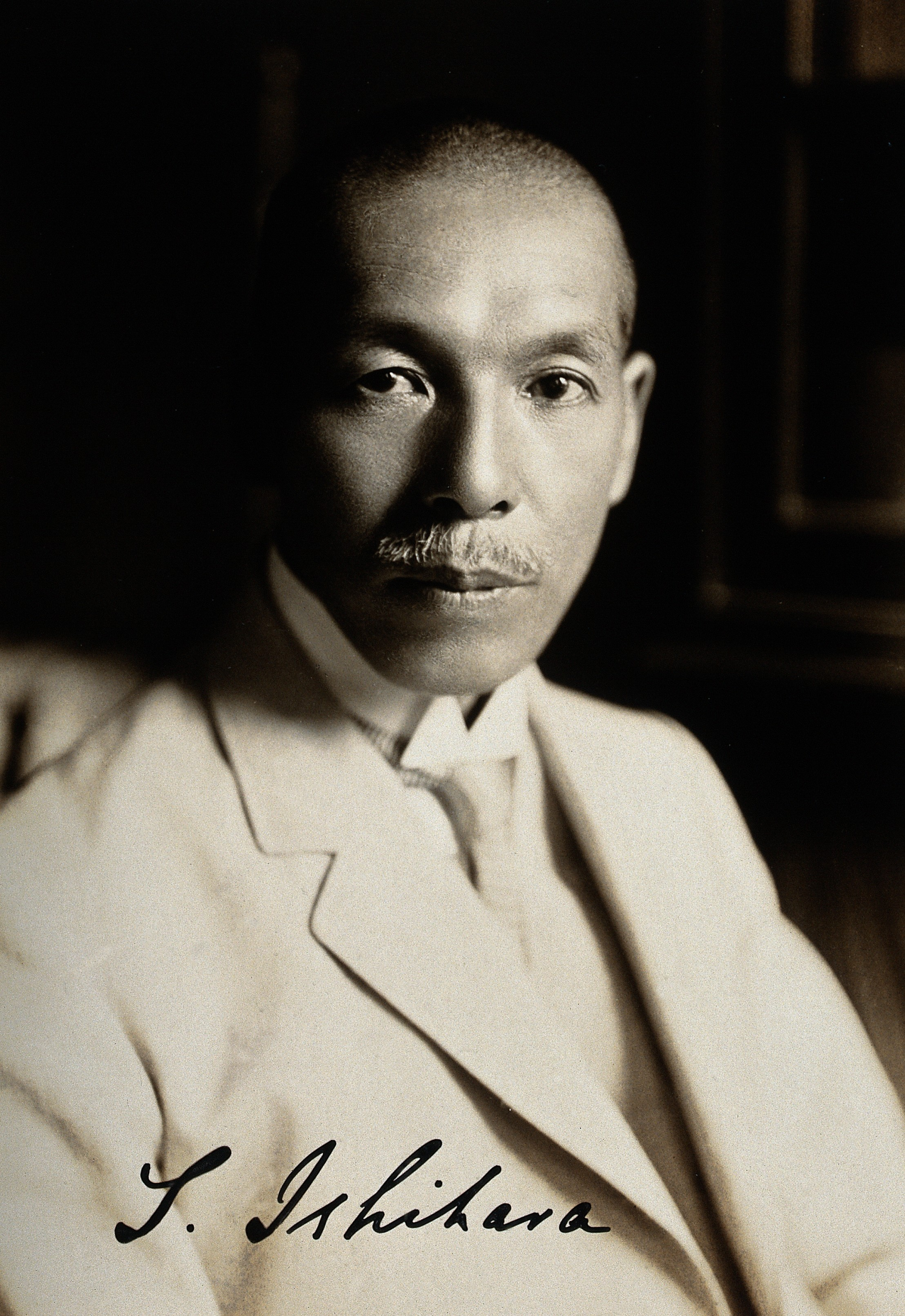
- Born: 25 September 1879; Tokyo, Japan
- Died: 3 January 1963 (aged 83); Izu Peninsula, Honshu, Japan
- Known for: Ishihara color test
- Scientific career
- Fields: ophthalmology

Shinobu Ishihara (石原 忍, Ishihara Shinobu; September 25, 1879 – January 3, 1963) was a Japanese ophthalmologist who created the Ishihara color test to detect colour blindness. He was an army surgeon.

== Early life and career ==
Ishihara graduated from medicine in 1905 on a military scholarship and immediately joined the Imperial Japanese Army as a doctor, serving mainly as a surgeon. He later changed specialties to ophthalmology. In 1908 he returned to the University of Tokyo where he dedicated himself to ophthalmic research. In 1910 he became an instructor at the Army Medical College. There, in addition to seeing patients, he conducted research on "battlefield ophthalmology" and how to select superior soldiers. While working at the Military Medical School he was asked to devise a test to screen military recruits for abnormalities of color vision. His assistant was a color blind physician who helped him test the plates. The first charts were hand painted by Ishihara in watercolor and depicted hiragana characters.

== Ishihara color vision test ==
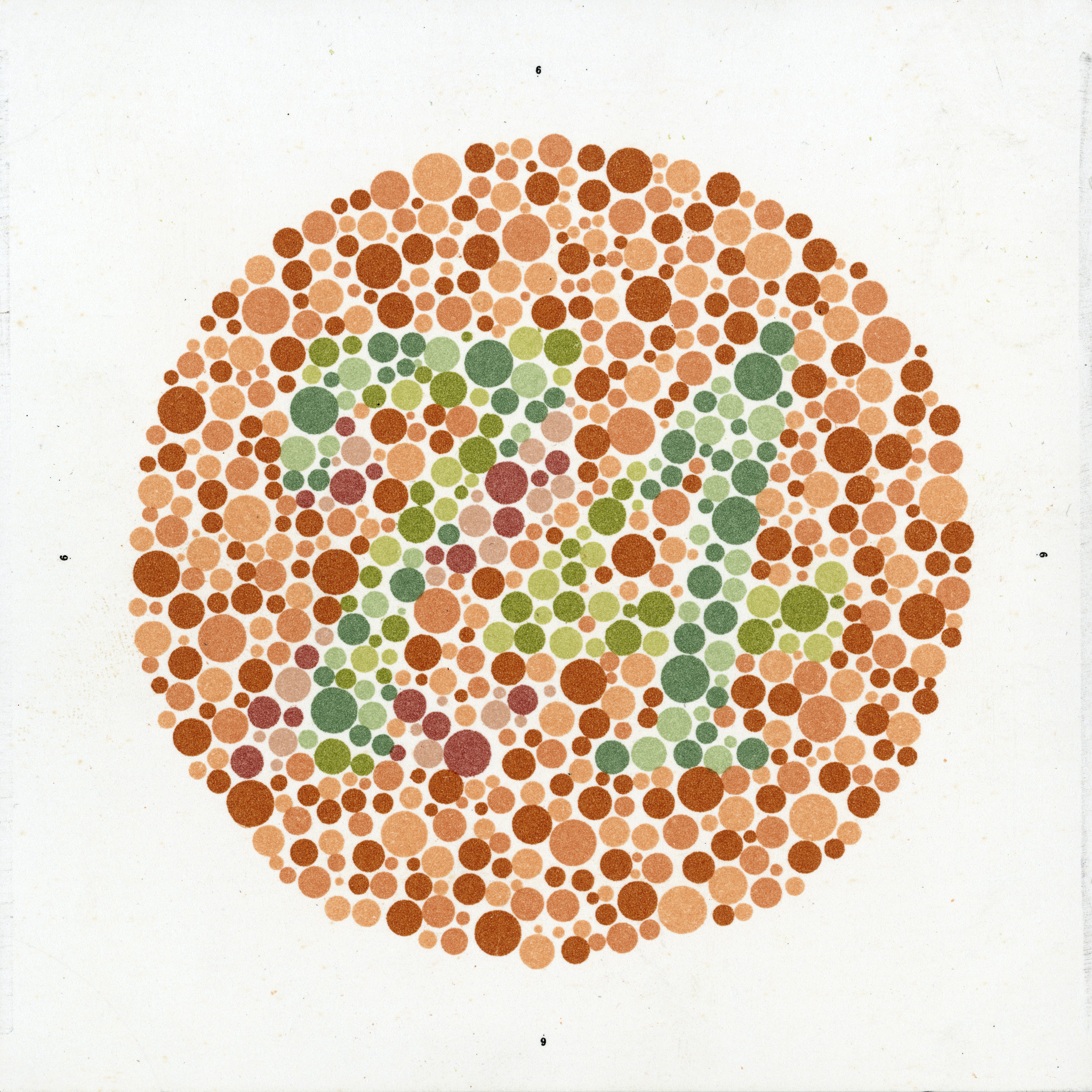
One of the Ishihara plates

The name Ishihara is known worldwide because of the color vision test he published in 1917, where a subject is shown a coloured pattern and asked what numerals they see there. Subjects with different forms of color blindness give different answers to those without. Ishihara also developed a Japanese visual acuity chart and an apparatus for determining the near point, both currently in wide use in Japan. He also made significant contributions to the study of trachoma and myopia.

In 1908, Ishihara entered the postgraduate course in ophthalmology at the Imperial University of Tokyo, studying under Jujiro Komoto. Subsequently, he studied in Germany under Professors Wolfgang Stock, Theodor Axenfeld and Carl von Hess. Ishihara was appointed the professor and chairman, to succeed Komoto, at the Ophthalmology Department of the Imperial University of Tokyo in 1922 and served until March 1940.

Received the Person of Cultural Merit distinction in 1961.

== Personal life ==
Ishihara led a very modest life, with no interest in material possessions. He was greatly revered by his students who, after his retirement, built a cottage for him near a hot spring on the Izu Peninsula. There he served as a country doctor, conducting clinics for his neighbors, asking no payment. As was the custom in those days, patients left tokens of their gratitude in home-grown produce and small sums of money. After covering his expenses, Ishihara returned all remaining money to the villagers. These funds were used to build a library and a study room for the village children.
