= Anomaloscope =

Instrument used to test for color blindness and color anomaly

- Purpose: To screen and test colour blindness

An anomaloscope is an instrument and color vision test, often used to quantify and characterize color blindness. They are expensive and require specialized knowledge to operate, but are viewed as the gold standard for color vision standards. As a result, they are normally used for academic studies, rather than job pre-screening. They are also used to validate other color vision standards with regard to classification of color vision defects.

== Principle ==
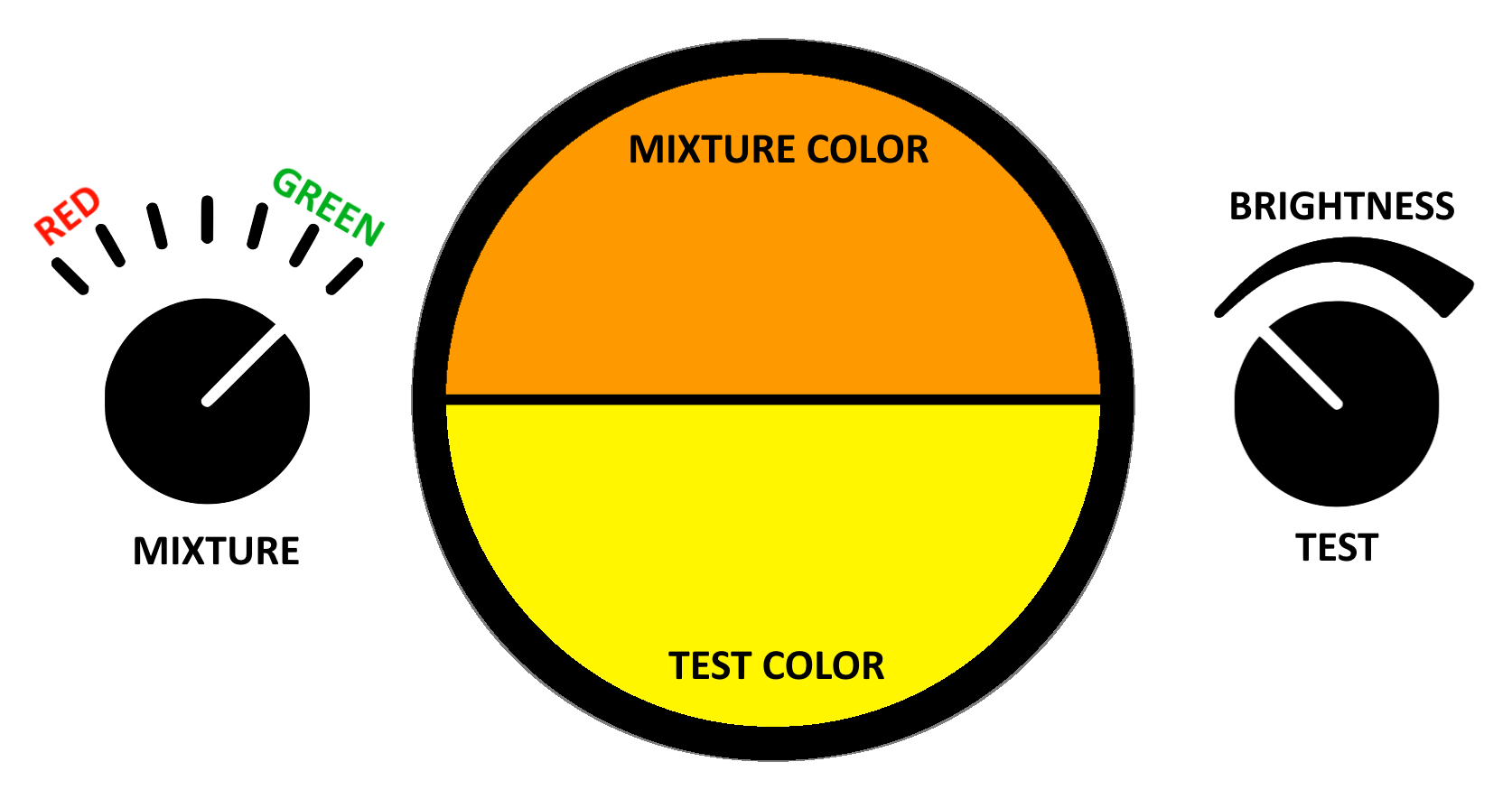
Anomaloscope using a Rayleigh Match

An anomaloscope requires a subject to make a color match between a mixture color and a test color. The test color is a single spectral color, for which the subject can adjust the brightness. The mixture color combines two spectral colors, for which the subject can adjust the proportion, thereby changing the hue. These two colored lights are positioned side-by-side and the subject changes the two parameters until the colors appear to match. The parameter values at match define the type and strength of the color vision defect.

The wavelengths of the three lights used for an anomaloscope are defined by the match of equation that the anomaloscope is defined to. There are four different matches:

- Rayleigh Match – a test light at 589 nm (yellow) and mixture lights at 545 nm (yellow-green) and 670 nm (red). This is used to characterize red-green deficiencies.
- Engelking-Trendelenburg Match – a test light at 490 nm (cyan) and mixture lights at 470 nm (blue) and 517 nm (green). This is used to characterize blue-yellow deficiencies.
- Pickford-Lakowski Match – a test light from a tungsten bulb and mixture lights at 470 nm (blue) and 585 nm (yellow-orange) lights. This is used to characterize blue-yellow deficiencies.
- Moreland Match – mixture lights at 436 nm (blue) and 490 nm (cyan) light. Unlike the other matches, the test light is not a monochromatic light where the brightness is adjusted. Rather, it is a dichromatic mixture of 480 nm (cyan-blue) light and its Complementary color 580 nm (yellow). The yellow acts to desaturate the cyan-blue without changing its hue. The colors are therefore called the primary mixture color and the desaturant mixture color. This is used to characterize blue-yellow deficiencies.

== History ==
Lord Rayleigh first invented a color mixing apparatus based on the Rayleigh match and discovered that some users made matches with proportions far different from the majority of users. The first anomaloscope was invented by the German ophthalmologist and physiologist Willibald A. Nagel (1870–1911) who named it Anomaloskop in 1907. It was based on the Rayleigh match.

The Pickford-Nicolson anomaloscope was developed in 1960. It measured the Rayleigh, Engelking-Trendelenburg and Pickford-Lakowski, making it the first anomaloscope to measure in both axes. The standardization of anomaloscopes is dictated by DIN-Norm 6160, first published in 1966 and last revised in 2019.

The Moreland Anomaloscope was developed in 1984 and used the Moreland match. Earlier blue-yellow matches had problems with large variance in results from color normals. The Moreland match improved has a much lower variance for color normals.

Nagel Anomaloscopes are out of production, but are still widely used as color vision standards. The Neitz Anomaloscope (1980) was produced to mimic the Nagel Anomaloscope, and are generally treated as interchangeable. The Oculus HMC (Heidelberg) Anomaloscope (Rayleigh & Moreland matches) and Neitz Anomaloscope (Rayleigh match) are the only anomaloscopes currently in production.

The expense and expertise required to operate anomaloscopes has put pressure on the development of simple, inexpensive digital anomaloscopes based on RGB primaries. Several web-based applications simulating anomaloscopes currently exist. As early as 2000, researchers attempted to accurately simulate the anomaloscope on a RGB CRT monitor. Validation of digital simulations of anomaloscopes has been lacking.
