= Optics and vision =

Overview of the vision and optics of humans and other organisms

Vision of humans and other organisms depends on several organs such as the lens of the eye, and any vision correcting devices, which use optics to focus the image.

The eyes of many animals contains a lens that focuses the light of its surroundings onto the retina of the eye. This lens is essential to producing clear images within the eye.

However, some individuals may have problems with focus, such as myopia or presbyopia. In this case, the focus of the eyes can be corrected with an external lens, such as glasses or contact lenses, or through surgery.

== Visual perception ==
Visual perception is the ability to interpret information and surroundings from visible light reaching the eye. The resulting perception is also known as eyesight, sight or vision. The various physiological components involved in vision are referred to collectively as the visual system, and are the focus of much research in psychology, cognitive science, neuroscience and molecular biology.

=== Human Visual system ===
The visual system in humans allows individuals to assimilate information from the environment. The act of seeing starts when the lens of the eye focuses an image of its surroundings onto a light-sensitive membrane in the back of the eye, called the retina. The retina converts patterns of light into neuronal signals. The lens of the eye focuses light on the photoreceptive cells of the retina, which detect the photons of light and respond by producing neural impulses. These signals are processed in a hierarchical fashion by different parts of the brain, from the retina to the lateral geniculate nucleus, to the primary and secondary visual cortex of the brain. Signals from the retina can also travel directly from the retina to the Superior colliculus.

=== Human eye ===
The human eye is an organ which reacts to light for several purposes.

As a conscious sense organ, the eye allows vision. Rod and cone cells in the retina allow conscious light perception and vision including color differentiation and the perception of depth. The human eye can distinguish about 10 million colors.

The human eye's non-image-forming photosensitive ganglion cells in the retina receive the light signals which affect adjustment of the size of the pupil, regulation and suppression of the hormone melatonin and entrainment of the body clock.

=== Visual acuity ===
Visual acuity is acuteness or clearness of vision, especially form vision, which is dependent on the sharpness of the retinal focus within the eye and the sensitivity of the interpretative faculty of the brain.

Visual acuity is a quantitative measure of the ability to identify black symbols on a white background at a standardized distance as the size of the symbols is varied. It is the most common clinical measurement of visual function. In the term "20/20 vision" the numerator refers to the distance in feet from which a person can reliably distinguish a pair of objects. The denominator is the distance from which an 'average' person would be able to distinguish —the distance at which their separation angle is 1 arc minute. The metric equivalent is 6/6 vision where the distance is 6 meters. The 20/x number does not directly relate to the eyeglass prescription required to correct vision; rather an eye exam seeks to find the prescription that will provide at least 20/20 vision.

== Non-Surgical Visual Correction ==
=== Corrective lens ===
A corrective lens is a lens worn in front of the eye, mainly used to treat myopia, hyperopia, astigmatism, and presbyopia. The goal is to bring vision up to 20/20 vision or as close to this as possible. Glasses or "spectacles" are corrective lenses worn on the face a short distance in front of the eye. Contact lenses are worn directly on the surface of the eye. Intraocular lenses are surgically implanted most commonly after cataract removal, but recently for purely refractive purposes. Myopia (short sightedness) requires a divergent lens, whereas hyperopia (far sightedness) requires convergent lens.

==== Prescription of corrective lenses ====
Corrective lenses are typically prescribed by an optometrist. The prescription consists of all the specifications necessary to make the lens. Prescriptions typically include the power specifications of each lens (for each eye). Strengths are generally prescribed in quarter-diopter steps (0.25 D) because most people cannot generally distinguish between smaller increments (ex. eighth-diopter steps / 0.125 D).

==== Glasses ====
Glasses (also called eyeglasses or spectacles) are frames bearing lenses worn in front of the eyes, normally for vision correction, eye protection, or for protection from UV rays.

Modern glasses are typically supported by pads on the bridge of the nose and by temple arms placed over the ears. Historical types include the pince-nez, monocle, lorgnette, and scissors-glasses.

Eyeglass lenses are commonly made from plastic, including CR-39 and polycarbonate. These materials reduce the danger of breakage and weigh less than glass lenses. Some plastics also have more advantageous optical properties than glass, such as better transmission of visible light and greater absorption of ultraviolet light. Some plastics have a greater index of refraction than most types of glass; this is useful in the making of corrective lenses shaped to correct various vision abnormalities such as myopia, allowing thinner lenses for a given prescription.

==== Contact lenses ====
A contact lens (also known simply as a contact) is a corrective, cosmetic, or therapeutic lens usually placed on the cornea of the eye. Modern soft contact lenses were invented by the Czech chemist Otto Wichterle and his assistant Drahoslav Lím, who also invented the first gel used for their production.

Contact lenses usually serve the same corrective purpose as glasses, but are lightweight and virtually invisible—many commercial lenses are tinted a faint blue to make them more visible when immersed in cleaning and storage solutions. Some cosmetic lenses are deliberately colored to alter the appearance of the eye. Lenses now have a slight bluish tint which is a thin UV coating; this reduces glare and cornea damage much like a pair of sunglasses.

== Surgical Vision Correction ==
=== Photorefractive keratectomy ===
Photorefractive keratectomy (PRK) and Laser-Assisted Sub-Epithelial Keratectomy (or Laser Epithelial Keratomileusis) (LASEK) are laser eye surgery procedures intended to correct a person's vision, reducing dependency on glasses or contact lenses. The first LASEK procedure was performed at Massachusetts Eye and Ear Infirmary in 1996 by ophthalmologist, refractive surgeon, Dimitri Azar. The procedure was later popularized by Camellin, who coined the term LASEK for laser epithelial keratomileusis.

LASEK and PRK permanently change the shape of the anterior central cornea using an excimer laser to ablate (remove by vaporization) a small amount of tissue from the corneal stroma at the front of the eye, just under the corneal epithelium. The outer layer of the cornea is removed prior to the ablation. A computer system tracks the patient's eye position 60 to 4,000 times per second, depending on the brand of laser used, redirecting laser pulses for precise placement. Most modern lasers will automatically center on the patient's visual axis and will pause if the eye moves out of range and then resume ablating at that point after the patient's eye is re-centered.

=== Cataract Surgery ===
Insertion of an intraocular lens for the treatment of cataracts is the most commonly performed eye surgical procedure. The procedure can be done under local anesthesia with the patient awake throughout the operation. The use of a flexible [intraocular lens] enables the lens to be rolled for insertion into the capsule through a very small incision, thus avoiding the need for stitches, and this procedure usually takes less than 30 minutes in the hands of an experienced ophthalmologist. After surgery, patients should avoid strenuous exercise or anything else that significantly increases blood pressure. They should also visit their ophthalmologists regularly for several months so as to monitor the implants.

Most intraocular lenses fitted today are fixed monofocal lenses matched to distance vision. However, other types are available, such as multifocal IOLs which provide the patient with multiple-focused vision at far and reading distance, and adaptive IOLs which provide the patient with limited visual accommodation.

== See also ==
- Visual perception
- Visual acuity
- Human eye
- Corrective lens
- Eyeglass prescription
- Glasses
- Contact lens
- Intraocular lens
- Photorefractive keratectomy
- LASIK
- Optics
