= Color vision test =

Tests for color vision against a standard

A color vision test is used for measuring color vision against a standard. These tests are most often used to diagnose color vision deficiencies ("CVD", or color blindness), though several of the standards are designed to categorize normal color vision into sub-levels. With the large prevalence of color vision deficiencies (8% of males) and the wide range of professions that restrict hiring the colorblind for safety or aesthetic reasons, clinical color vision standards must be designed to be fast and simple to implement. Color vision standards for academic use trade speed and simplicity for accuracy and precision.

== Applications ==
Color vision standards are used to evaluate the color vision of a subject. They are most commonly applied to job applicants during pre-job screening. The evaluation may be to select against the color vision deficient for roles where basic color vision is required, or to select for individuals with superior color vision for roles where recognition of subtle color difference is required.

Alterations to color vision are common symptoms of toxicity and eye health, so color vision standards can also be used to detect conditions of the eye or brain or to track the recovery from these conditions.

== Pseudoisochromatic plates ==
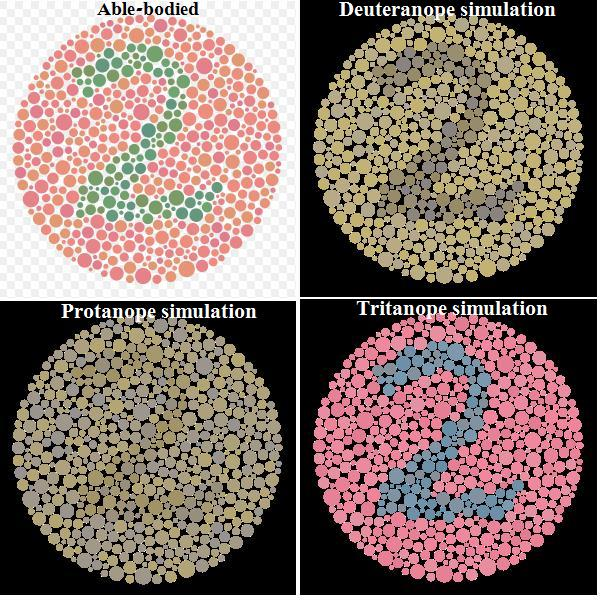
An Ishihara test image as seen by subjects with normal color vision and by those with a variety of color deficiencies

A pseudoisochromatic plate (from Greek pseudo, meaning "false", iso, meaning "same" and chromo, meaning "color"), often abbreviated as PIP, is a style of standard exemplified by the Ishihara test, generally used for screening of color vision defects.

A figure (usually one or more numerals) is embedded in the plate as a number of spots surrounded by spots of a slightly different color. The figure can be seen with normal color vision, but not with a particular color defect. The figure and background colors must be carefully chosen to appear isochromatic to a color deficient individual, but not an individual with normal color vision.

Pseudoisochromatic Plates are used as screening tools because they are cheap, fast and simple, but they do not provide precise diagnosis of CVD, and are often followed with another test if a user fails the PIP standard.

=== Ishihara plates ===
Ishihara plates hide Arabic numerals within PIPs. They are the test most often used to screen for red–green color deficiencies and most often recognized by the public. However, this can be attributed more to its ease of application, and less to do with its precision.

The basic Ishihara test may not be useful in diagnosing young, preliterate children, who can't read the numerals, but larger editions contain plates that showcase a simple path to be traced with a finger, rather than numerals.

=== HRR plates ===
The second most common PIP color vision standard is the HRR color test (developed by Hardy, Rand, and Rittler), which solves many of the criticisms of the Ishihara test. For example, it detects blue-yellow color blindness, is less susceptible to memorization and uses shapes, so it is accessible to the illiterate and young children.

=== City University test ===
City University test contains test plates that can be used to detect all types of color vision deficiencies. The test which was derived from Farnsworth D15 color arrangement test, consists of 10 plates, containing a central colored dot surrounded by four peripheral dots of different colors. The subject is asked to choose the dot closest to the central hue, allowing abnormalities to be detected according to the responses.

== Arrangement tests ==
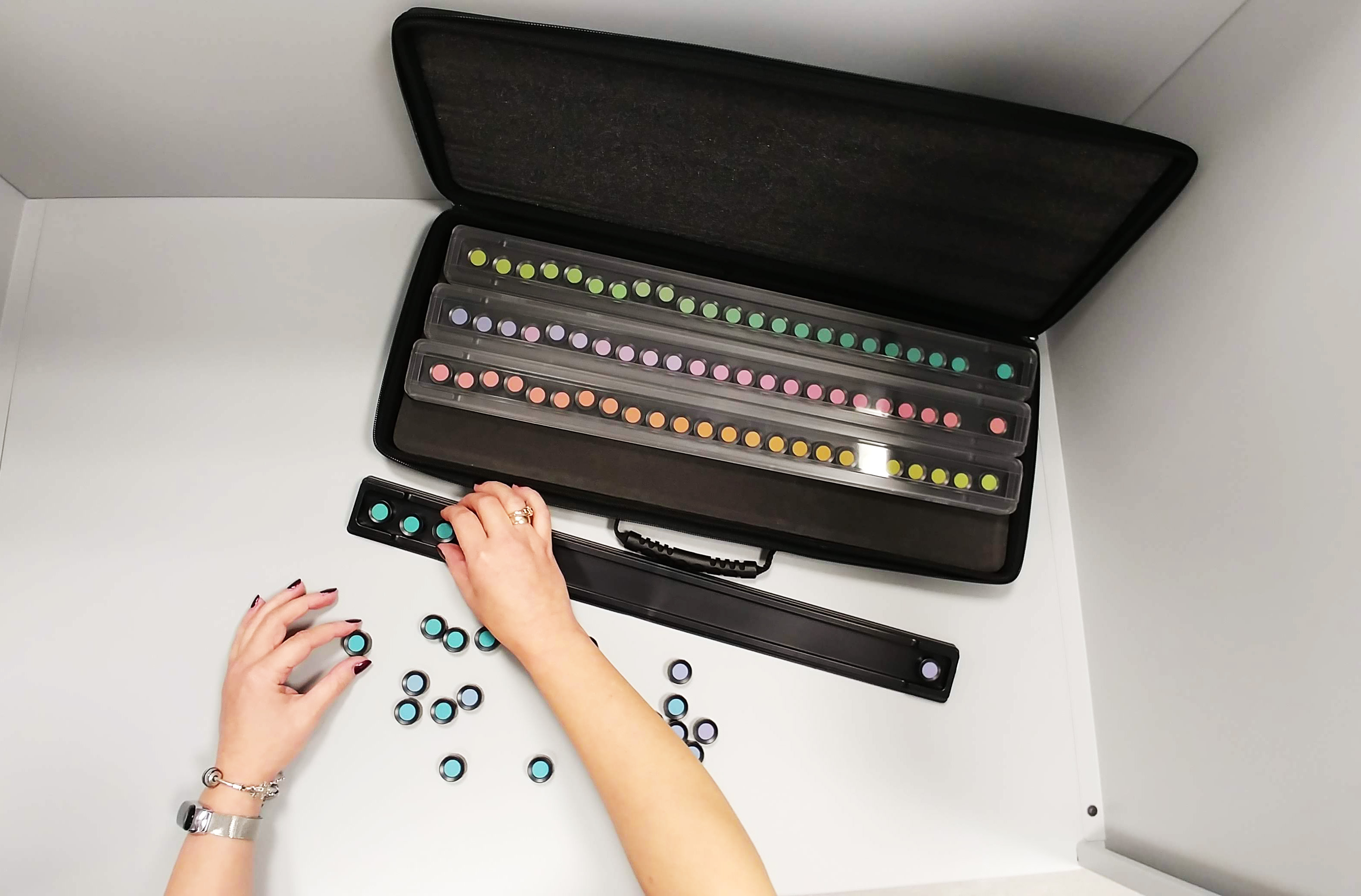
A Farnsworth–Munsell 100 Hue Test

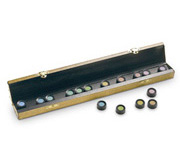
A Farnsworth D-15 test

Arrangement-style color vision standards comprise a spectrum of colors that must be arranged in an array to minimize the difference between adjacent colors. An error score is calculated from incorrectly positioned colors. Lower error scores denote better color vision. Typically, the subject is asked to arrange a set of colored caps or chips between two anchor caps.

The Farnsworth–Munsell 100 hue test comprises 4 separate color arrays, each representing 20 arrangeable caps and 2 anchor caps. This gives a total of 88 colors, contrary to the standard's name. The standard is sensitive enough that it not only can detect color blindness, but also categorize normal color vision into "low", "average" and "superior" levels based on their error score. It is usually not used for the detection of CVD.

The Farnsworth D-15 is simpler, comprising a single array, which itself comprises 1 end cap and 15 arrangeable caps. It is primarily used for occupational screening of CVD and is the standard of choice in most US/Canadian Police Forces (after screening with Ishihara). About 50% of people who fail the Ishihara are able to pass the D15.

== Lanterns ==
Lanterns project small colored lights to a subject, who is required to identify the color of the lights. The colors are usually restricted to those of typical signal lights, i.e. red, green and yellow, though some lanterns may project other colors. The main signal light colors also happen to be colors of confusion for red-green CVD.

Lanterns are usually used for occupational screening as they are more closely related to the actual safety-related color tasks required in those occupations. For example, the Farnsworth Lantern Test is used extensively by the United States Armed Forces and FAA. This test allows about 30% of individuals who fail the ishihara plates (generally those with mild CVD) to pass.

== Anomaloscopes ==
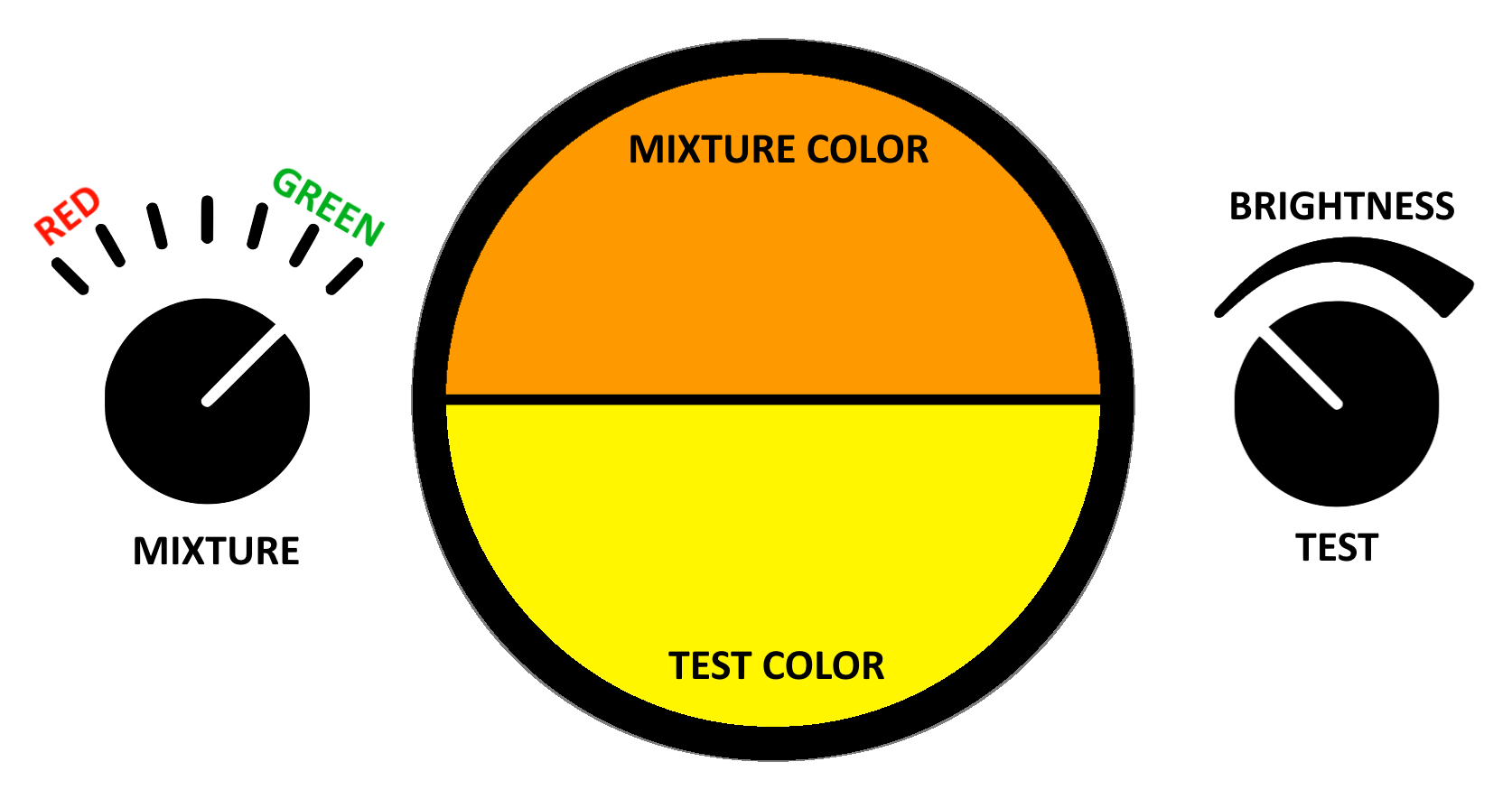
Anomaloscope using a Rayleigh Match

Anomaloscopes are very expensive and require expertise to administer, so are generally only used in academic settings. However, they are very precise, being able to diagnose the type and severity of color blindness with high confidence. An anomaloscope designed to detect red–green color blindness is based on the Rayleigh equation, which compares a mixture of red and green light in variable proportions to a fixed spectral yellow of variable luminosity. The subject must change the two variables until the colors appear to match. The values of the variables at match (and the deviation from the variables of a color normal subject) are used to diagnose the type and severity of colorblindness. For example, deutans will put too much green in the mixture and protans will put too much red in the mixture.

== Digital tests ==
The graduation of color vision tests to the digital space offers several advantages, but is not trivial. Even if the digital tests mimic a traditional test, the digital version must be requalified or validated and every screen it is viewed on must be well-calibrated. Freely available web-based tests suffer from a lack of validation and typical viewing on uncalibrated screens. However, when well controlled, digital tests offer several significant advantages over their analog counterparts:

- They randomize solutions, which eliminates memorization
- The test can adapt in real time to the subject's performance (e.g. give more protan questions if the subject appears to be a protan)
- They don't suffer from color fading like the pigments/dyes in analog tests.
- The variance in test administration is minimized
- The tests are immune to mistakes in interpreting the results
- Test parameters can be dynamic and vary with time

Validated digital tests used for occupational screening include:

- Cambridge Color Test (CCT) (Cambridge University, 1997)
- Colour Assessment and Diagnosis (CAD) Test (City University London, 2002)
- Colour Vision Assessment (University of Minho, 2016)
