= Farnsworth–Munsell 100 hue test =

Test of the human visual system

- The Munsell color system, showing a circle of hues at value 5 chroma 6, the neutral values from 0 to 10, and the chromas of purple-blue (5PB) at value 5
- Synonyms: Munsell vision test
- Purpose: Detection of color blindness

The Farnsworth–Munsell 100 Hue Color Vision test is a color vision test often used to test for color blindness. The system was developed by Dean Farnsworth in the 1940s and it tests the ability to isolate and arrange minute differences in various color targets with constant value and chroma that cover all the visual hues described by the Munsell color system. There are several variations of the test, one featuring 100 color hues and one featuring 15 color hues. Originally taken with physical hue tiles, the test is now taken from computer consoles. An accurate quantification of color vision accuracy is particularly important to designers, photographers and colorists, who all rely on accurate color vision to produce quality content.

== Vision tests ==
=== 100 hue test ===
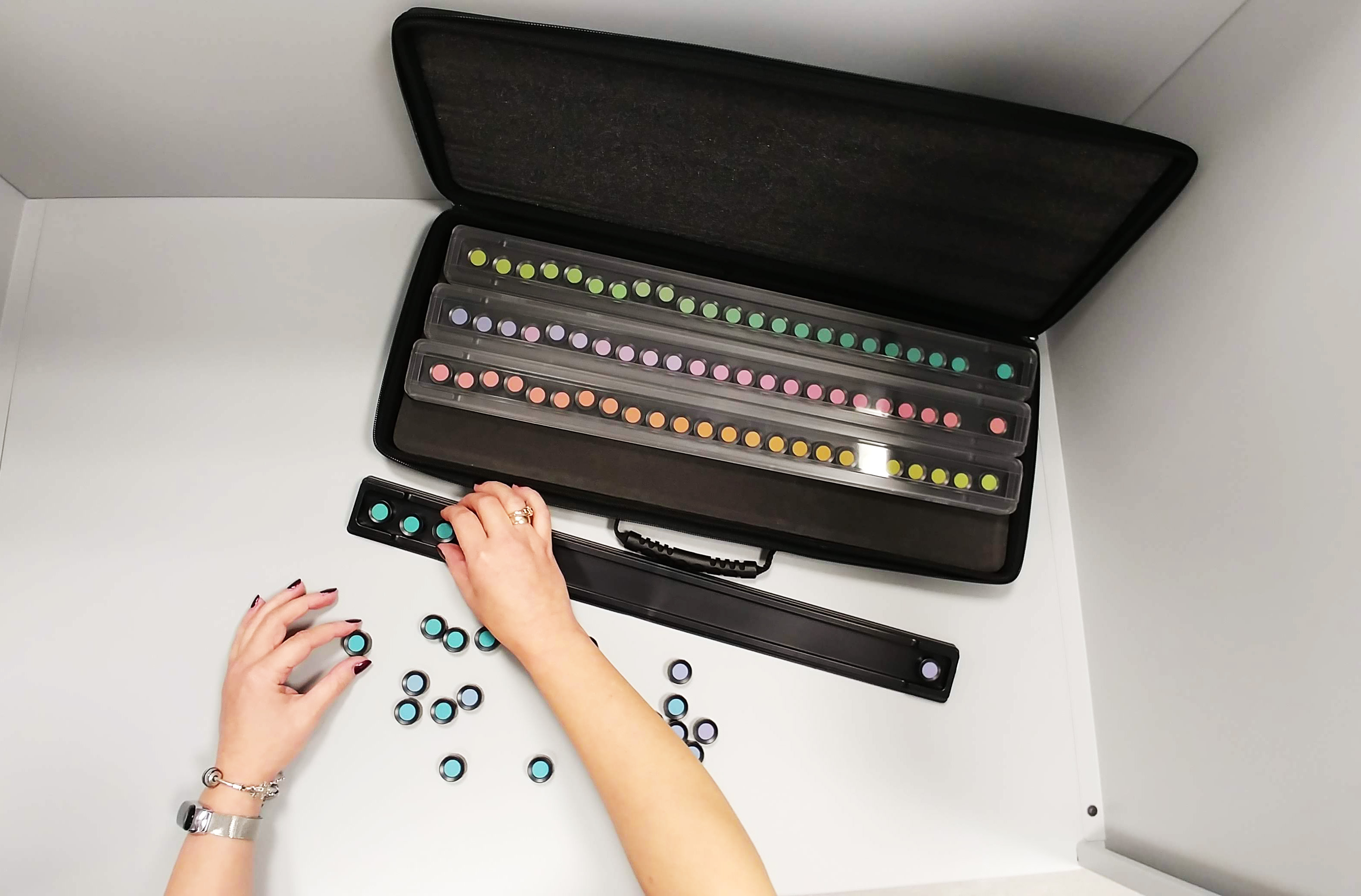
A Farnsworth–Munsell 100 Hue Test

The most common form of the Farnsworth–Munsell 100 Hue Color Vision Test contains four distinct rows of similar color hues, each containing 25 distinct variations of each hue. Each color hue at the polar end of a row is fixed in position, to serve as an anchor. Each hue tile between the anchors can be adjusted as the observer sees fit. The final arrangement of the hue tiles represents the aptitude of the visual system in discerning differences in color hue. Failures within the observer's visual system can be measured as a function of two factors contained within the test; either the amount of instances that a tile is misplaced, or the severity of a tile displacement (i.e., the distance between where a tile should have been placed and where it was actually placed.).

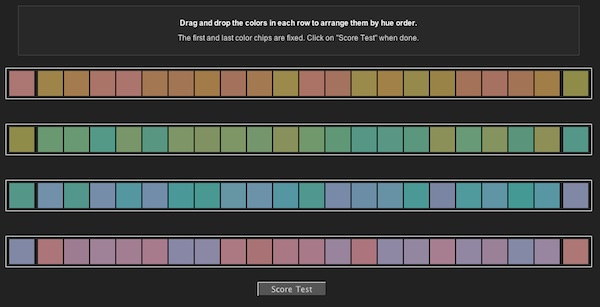
Tile arrangement for the 100 hue test

The tiles are arranged in four rows based on color hue. The rows cover orange/magenta hues, yellow/green hues, blue/purple and purple/magenta hues, in that order. The physical derivative of the test is given on a black background to isolate and accentuate color hues, which are round and roughly an inch in diameter. The digital derivative of the test is based on square hue images, which are also presented on a black background, but can vary in size based on monitor, resolution, zoom and a variety of other external settings and variables. The digital distribution of the 100 Hues test is far more popular given its easy access for little or no licensing fee, and an apparent level of accuracy for most audiences. Taking the physical hue test under experimentally sound conditions (see Testing Environment) is far more accurate but the high price of the physical test kit is often prohibitive.

=== D15 test ===
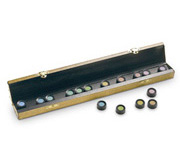
A physical set of tiles for the D15 hue color test

The Farnsworth–Munsell D15 Color Vision Test is an older version of the test. It is composed of a single tray, holding 15 independent color hues. The D15 test is administered in the same way as the 100 Hues test; the same environmental factors are recommended for non-professional results and required to garner completely professional results. The key difference between the D15 and 100 Hues test is the intended pool of qualitative informative results. The 100 Hue test is administered in pursuit of measuring an individual's overall color vision acuity, while the primary purpose of the D15 test is to identify color vision defects, most notably red-green and blue-yellow color sensing deficiencies. The D15 test is most notable to be relevant to forms of color blindness or individuals suffering with vision that incorporates protanomaly, deuteranomaly, protanopia and deuteranopia. For more information on color vision deficiencies or color blindness, see color blindness.

== Environmental factors ==
The Munsell Vision Test is reliant on a wide assortment of environmental factors to generate accurate and consistent color vision results. Many of these factors are universal across both physical and digital releases of the test, although several are unique to either test in their own right. The CIE has determined some baseline values and experimental standards to be used in both editions of the test, others are fluid and merely require consistency from test to test.

=== Illuminants ===
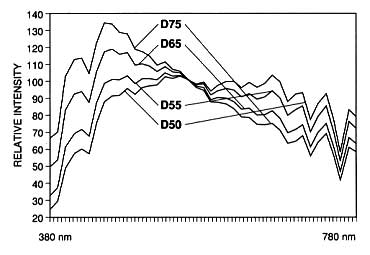
Illuminant curves

To ensure a consistent illumination spectrum for the test, standard illuminants D50 and D65 are acceptable for use, with the D50 illuminant being suggested for a calibrated and accurate color vision test result. Use of different illuminants can sway results in a significant manner due to the spectral power distribution of alternate sources and their incident effect on how displayed information is processed by the human visual system. Illuminants containing varying concentrations of differing wavelength intensity light skews the representation of color on the screen in a manner that would cause the eye to mismatch color patches. In combination with the spatial acuity function of the human visual system, illumination plays a significant role in the color accuracy of a display.

=== Screen calibration ===
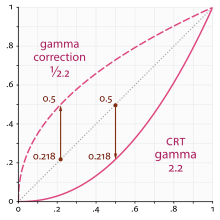
Standardized curves for common display gamma settings

Combined with ambient illumination of the scene, several other factors are also integral for testing environment standardization. Calculated screen gamma is a significant factor. As gamma changes for the display, the representation of color, contrast and saturation are affected proportional to the magnitude of the change of the gamma curve. CIE recommends a gamma value of 2.2 as it is the current display manufacturing standard. A proper, professional grade screen calibration is required in order for concretely accurate test information. Several companies manufacture portable display calibration tools. Tools such as these take into account the type of screen and the screen's primary illumination source.

There is no standard monitor hardware specification for the digital release of the Munsell Vision Test. Correct and thorough monitor calibration takes into account human visual system metamerism, a phenomenon that combines several color science elements to generate visual matching colors regardless of differences in source illumination, although it is ultimately not universally effective.

=== Formal monitor tests ===
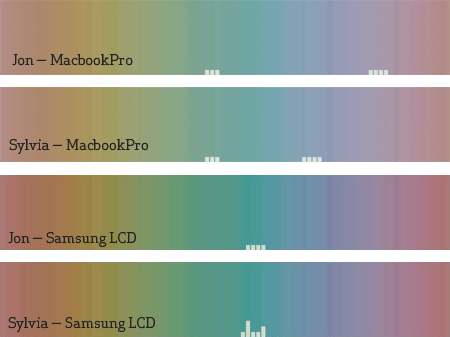
Error by display

Informative subject testing done at the Rochester Institute of Technology's Munsell Color Science Lab discovered consistent color perception difficulties when identical subjects performed the Munsell Vision Test on varying calibrated monitors in a test comparing color vision test results between Apple MacBook Pro laptop displays and a Samsung LCD Monitor. Results garnered from the experiment exemplified the differences that displays can exhibit in failure to accurately quantify color. Incident angle to the test monitor is a final strong source of experimental uncertainty, as very few monitors commercially available are capable of accurately representing hue, tone and saturation consistently at all viewing angles incident to the monitor.

=== Observer error ===
Several sources of error (and therefore, inherent accuracy shortcomings) are directly related to the observer. Although CIE demonstrates several sets of data regarding the optimal, standard observer, each individual observer differs slightly from the baseline. Factors like visual acuity, color blindness and visual system defects (cataracts, surgeries, LASIK, tinted optics, poor cone responsivity, etc.) are all directly tied to observer color perception accuracy. The accuracy of an observers test answers are represented in Test Results

== Test results and interpretation ==
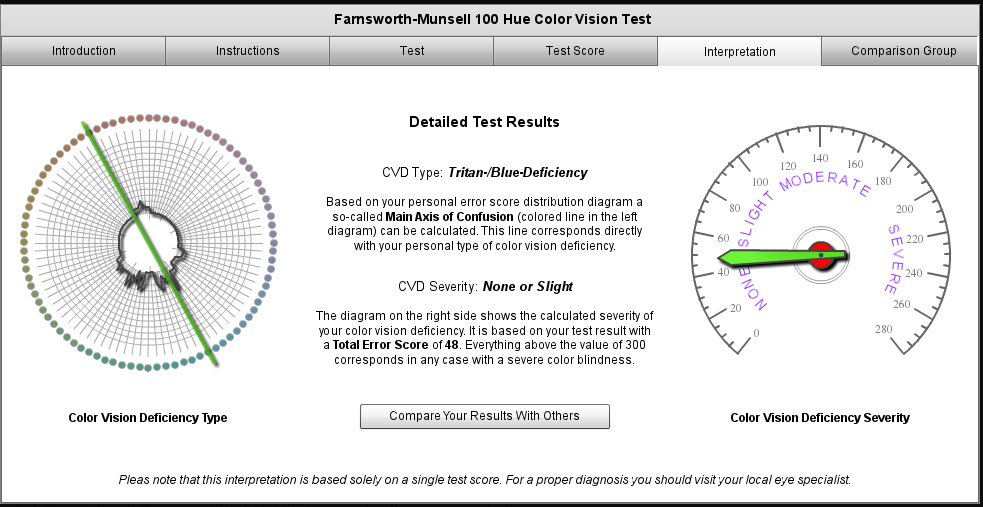
A typical scoring results screen from X-Rite's 100 Hues test evaluation software

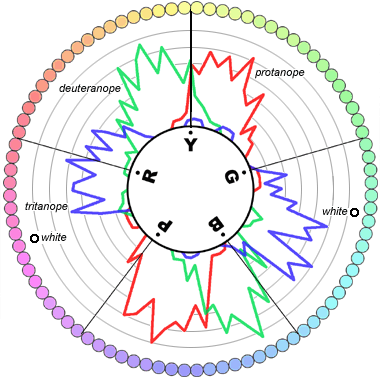
Colorblindness

Noting the sources of error previously addressed that are introduced by environmental factors and observer uncertainties, several digital test sources offer software installations that analyze the information garnered from the test. Data generated from X-Rite's online test offer several types of information, most notably the Total Estimation Score (TES), Color Vision Deficiency Type (CVDT) and Color Vision Deficiency Severity (CVDS). TES is an automated, generated value that calculates the number of tiles placed incorrectly and scales the value for uniform analysis. Average TES scores range from thirty to forty in series tests; while scores exceeding seventy can point to a marker for color blindness. Lower scores are intended to point to significantly increased color vision accuracy, as the TES score is directly correlated to the number of tiles incorrectly identified. Based on an axis interpretation of the information generated, a color vision deficiency type is also determined, based on a straight line plotted to intersect the center of the Munsell color sphere and the peak point of the highest color error spike. This axis is used to determine the color error tendencies the eye. From this information, if a value of seventy or higher is returned, a clinical form of color blindness can be estimated based upon the location of the CVDT axis. The magnitude of color error peaks is used to determine the magnitude of the observers Color Vision Deficiency Severity. Accuracy of the test is relative to the display and based upon its correct calibration.

== Relevant markets ==
Several industrial and commercial markets have great need for characterized and accurate color vision as well as tests to quantify color vision accuracy. Among these are divisions like healthcare systems, design companies and photography and motion picture industries. In order to generate color accurate products, employee vision accuracy is crucial as well.

=== Design ===
In the design sphere, there are several common yet largely important uses for color accuracy that lean heavily on the designers ability to accurately sense color. Careers such as graphic design, photography, graphics and color development are common fields that rely heavily on employees with accurate color vision. Additionally, paint engineering also relies heavily on color science employees with a demonstrated acuity in color vision. Examples of relevant companies includes Pantone and Sherwin-Williams.

=== Healthcare ===
In the medical sphere, it is important to have products to measure patients color vision. While medically professional vision tests are available, a Munsell Vision Test is often an informal and relevant test to determine a potential need for more thorough vision testing at the hands of pro staff or optometry experts. As previously mentioned, the Munsell-Farnsworth D15 Color Vision Test is a capable and professional method to test an individual.

=== Motion picture ===
Motion picture professionals also desire color vision acuity information for integral parts of film post production like color timing and final color correction. Since these processes are highly subjective to individuals such as the director and the colorist, accurate color vision is vital to the final aesthetic appearance of the film. In addition to this, engineers involved in the production and chemistry of film and digital systems engineering are reliant on proper color vision to construct and engineer imaging systems that accurately sense and represent color in stored images and display.

== See also ==
- Gamma correction
- International Commission on Illumination
- Standard illuminant
- Visual acuity
- White point
