= Ishihara test =

Color perception test

Color perception test
- Example of an Ishihara color test plate. The number "74" should be clearly visible to viewers with normal color vision. Viewers with red–green color blindness will read it as "21", and viewers with monochromacy may see nothing.
- Specialty: Ophthalmology
- ICD-9-CM: 95.06
- MeSH: D003119

The Ishihara test is a color vision test for detection of red–green color deficiencies. It was named after its designer, Shinobu Ishihara, a professor at the University of Tokyo, who first published his tests in 1917.

The test consists of a number of Ishihara plates, which are a type of pseudoisochromatic plate. Each plate depicts a solid circle of colored dots appearing randomized in color and size. Within the pattern are dots which form a number or shape clearly visible to those with normal color vision, but which are difficult or impossible to see for those with a red–green color vision deficiency. Other plates are intentionally designed to reveal numbers only to those with a red–green color vision deficiency, and be invisible to those with normal red–green color vision. The full test consists of 38 plates, but the existence of a severe deficiency is usually apparent after only a few plates. There are also Ishihara tests consisting of 10, 14 or 24 test plates, and plates in some versions ask the viewer to trace a line rather than read a number.

== Plates ==
The plates make up several different test designs:

Demonstration plates
(Plate number one, typically the numeral "12"); designed to be visible by all subjects, whether normal or color vision deficient. For demonstration purposes only, and usually not considered in making a score for screening purposes.
Transformation plates
Individuals with color vision deficiency should see a different figure from individuals with normal color vision.
Vanishing plates
Only individuals with normal color vision could recognize the figure.
Hidden digit plates
Only individuals with color vision deficiency could recognize the figure.
Diagnostic plates
Intended to determine the type of color vision deficiency (protanopia or deuteranopia) and the severity of it.
Tracing plates
Instead of reading a number, subjects are asked to trace a visible line across the plate.

Ishihara Plate No. 1 (12)

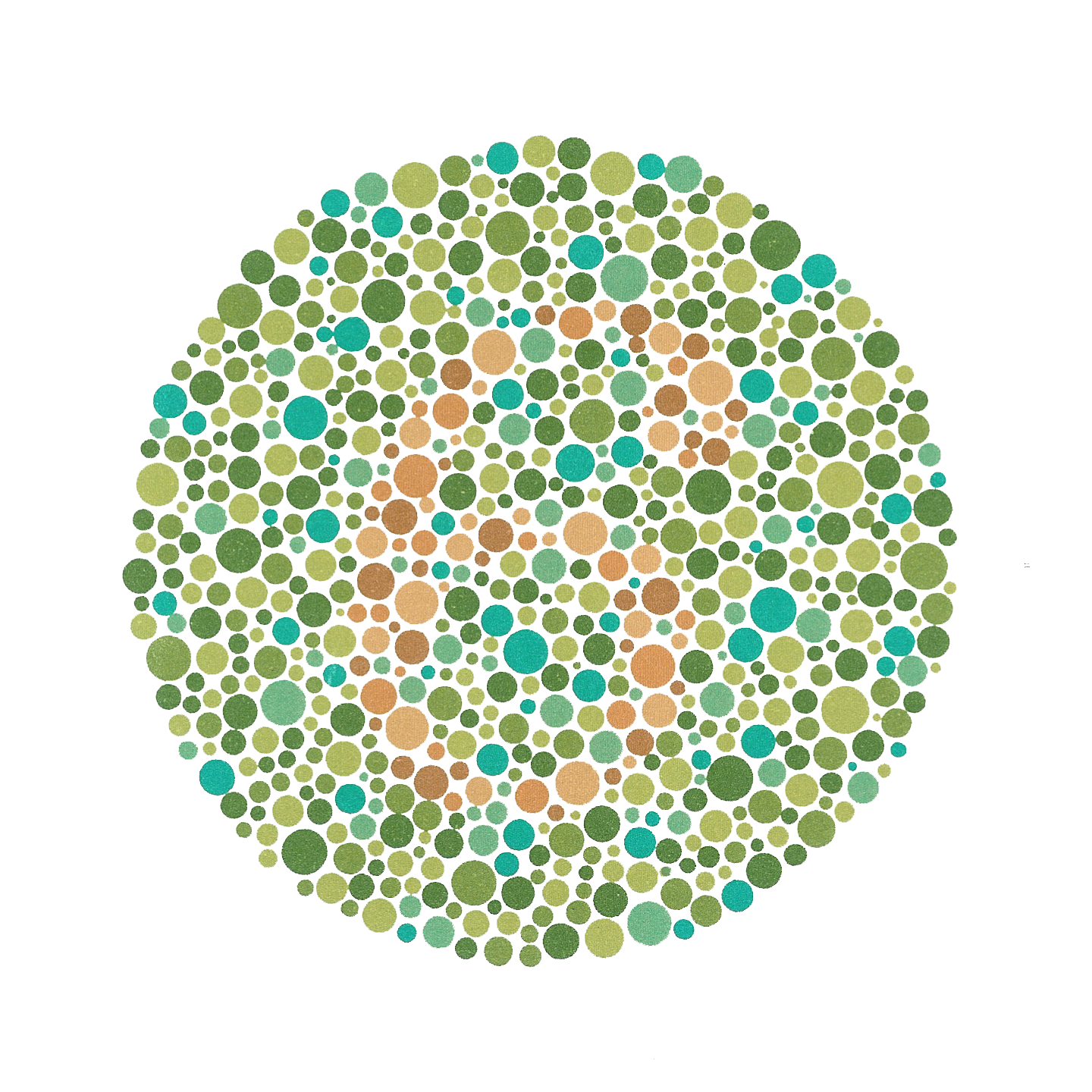
Ishihara Plate No. 11 (6)

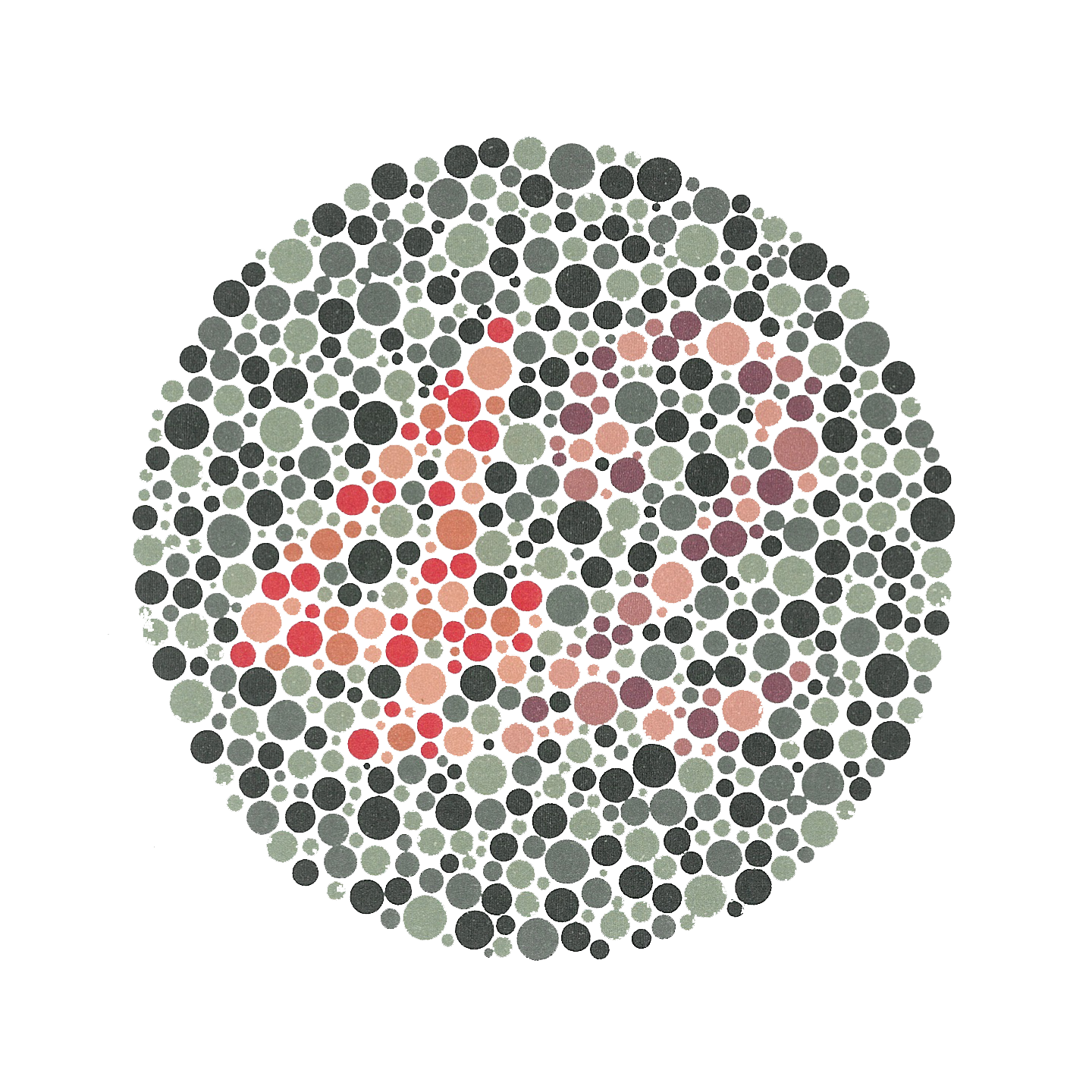
Ishihara Plate No. 23 (42)

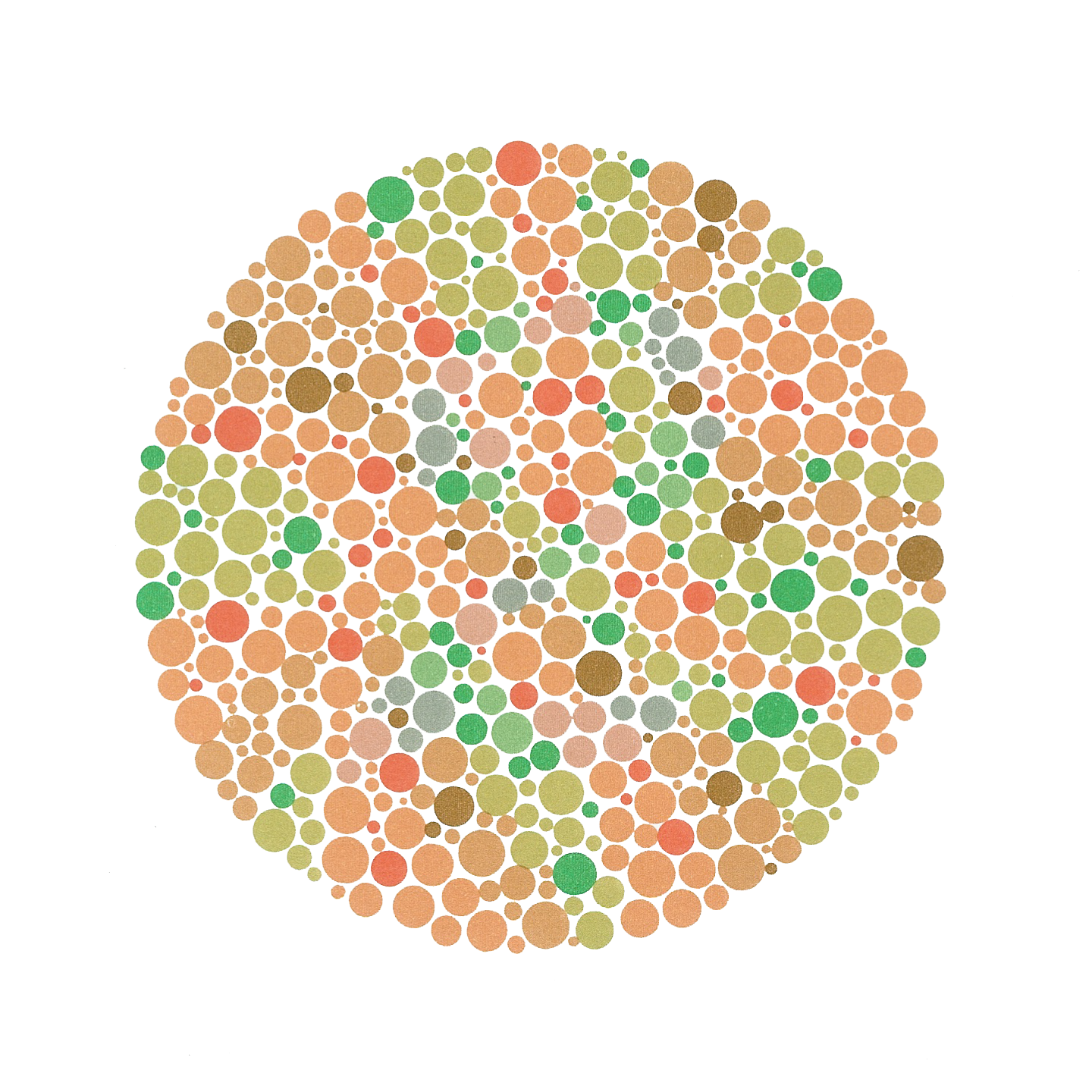
Ishihara Plate No. 19 (hidden 2)

The numbering and rotation of plates differs between the shortened diagnostic versions of the test and the full 38-plate test.

== History ==
Born in 1879 to a family in Tokyo, Shinobu Ishihara began his education at the Imperial University where he attended on a military scholarship. Ishihara had just completed his graduate studies in ophthalmology in Germany when war broke out in Europe and World War I had begun. While holding a military position related to his field, he was given the task of creating a color blindness test. Ishihara studied existing tests and combined elements of the Stilling test, named after the German ophthalmologist Jakob Stilling, with the concept of pseudo-isochromaticism to produce an improved, more accurate and easier to use test.

== Test procedures ==
Being a printed plate, the accuracy of the test depends on using the proper lighting to illuminate the page. A "daylight" bulb illuminator is required to give the most accurate results, of around 6000–7000 K temperature (ideal: 6500 K, Color Rendering Index (CRI) >90), and is required for military color vision screening policy. Fluorescent bulbs are often used in school testing, but the color of fluorescent bulbs and their CRI can vary widely. Fluorescent lighting showed better results and faster recognition speed compared to CFL and LED luminance in trichromats. Incandescent bulbs should not be used, as their low temperature (yellow-color) gives highly inaccurate results, allowing some color vision deficient persons to pass.

Proper testing technique is to give only three seconds per plate for an answer, and not allow coaching, touching or tracing of the numbers by the subject. The test is best given in random sequence, if possible, to reduce the effectiveness of prior memorization of the answers by subjects. Some pseudo-isochromatic plate books have the pages in binders, so the plates may be rearranged periodically to give a random order to the test.

Since its creation, the Ishihara Color Blindness Test has become commonly used worldwide because of its easy use and high accuracy. In recent years, the Ishihara test has become available online in addition to its original paper version. Though both media use the same plates, they require different methods for an accurate diagnosis.

== Occupational screening ==
The United States Navy uses the Ishihara plates (and alternatives) for color vision screening. The current passing score is 10 correct of 14 red/green test plates (not including the demonstration plate).

Research has shown that scores below twelve indicate color vision deficiency, and twelve or more correct indicate normal color vision, with 97% sensitivity and 100% specificity. The sensitivity of the Ishihara test varies by the number of plates allowed to pass, which can vary by institutional policy. Sensitivity also may be influenced by test administration (strength of lighting, time allowed to answer) and testing errors (coaching by administrators, smudges or marks made upon the plates).
