= Blindness in animals =

Animals with limited visual perception

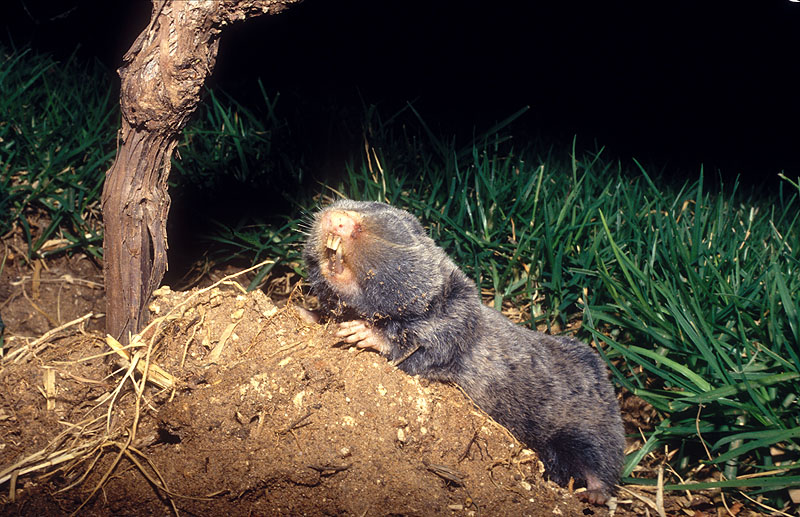
A blind mole-rat

Visual perception in animals plays an important role in the animal kingdom, most importantly for the identification of food sources and avoidance of predators. For this reason, blindness in animals is a unique topic of study.

In general, nocturnal or subterranean animals have less interest in the visual world, and depend on other sensory modalities. Visual capacity is a continuum, with humans falling somewhere in the center.

== Causes of blindness in animals ==
Blindness in animals can be caused by the result of environmental adaptations over time, or due to various conditions of the eyes. Many blind species have been able to adapt, navigate and survive in their environment by relying on their other senses. Some species are born without eyes such as the kauaʻi cave wolf spider, olm, and the Mexican tetra.

=== Cataracts ===
Cataracts are the result of the opacification or cloudiness of the lens in the eye. Cataracts can be developed through old age, diseases or trauma to the eye. Some animals that are prone to the development of cataracts are dogs, elephants, horses, pandas and seals. Cataracts are less common in cats in comparison to dogs, where it is fairly common. Just like with humans, cataract extraction surgery can be performed on cats and dogs.

=== Glaucoma ===
Glaucoma is a progressive condition the eye causes damage to the optic nerve. The damage to the optic nerve is usually caused by intraocular pressure of the eye being elevated. Glaucoma can be seen in dogs, and less commonly, cats. Treatment can be in the form of ocular medication, like prescription eye drops.

=== Infant blindness ===
Blindness at birth serves to preserve the young who are dependent on their parents. If they were capable of sight, they could wander off. Rabbits are born with eyes and ears closed, totally helpless. Humans have very poor vision at birth as well. See: Infant vision

Statements that certain species of mammals are "born blind" refer to them being born with their eyes closed and their eyelids fused together; the eyes open later. One example is the rabbit. In humans, the eyelids are fused for a while before birth, but open again before the normal birth time. Very premature babies are sometimes born with their eyes fused shut, which open later.

=== Colour blindness ===
Primates (including humans) are unique as they possess trichromatic color vision, and are able to discern between violet [short wave (SW)], green [medium wave (MW)], and yellow-green [long wave (LW)]. Mammals other than primates generally have less effective two-receptor color perception systems, allowing only dichromatic color vision; marine mammals have only a single cone type and are thus monochromats. Honey- and bumblebees have trichromatic color vision, which is insensitive to red but sensitive in ultraviolet to a color called bee purple.

Other animals, such as tropical fish and birds, have more complex color vision systems than humans. There is evidence that ultraviolet light plays a part in color perception in many branches of the animal kingdom, especially for insects; however, there has not been enough evidence to prove this. It has been suggested that it is likely that pigeons are pentachromats. Papilio butterflies apparently have tetrachromatic color vision despite possessing six photoreceptor types. The most complex color vision system in animal kingdom has been found in stomatopods with up to 12 different spectral receptor types which are thought to work as multiple dichromatic units.

== Natural selection ==
Charles Darwin cites moles as an example of mammals that have organs that have become vestigial and are being phased out by natural selection:

The eyes of moles and of some burrowing rodents are rudimentary in size, and in some cases are quite covered by skin and fur. This state of the eyes is probably due to gradual reduction from disuse, but aided perhaps by natural selection. In South America, a burrowing rodent, the tuco-tuco, or Ctenomys, is even more subterranean in its habits than the mole; and I was assured by a Spaniard, who had often caught them, that they were frequently blind. One which I kept alive was certainly in this condition, the cause, as appeared on dissection, having been inflammation of the nictitating membrane. As frequent inflammation of the eyes must be injurious to any animal, and as eyes are certainly not necessary to animals having subterranean habits, a reduction in their size, with the adhesion of the eyelids and growth of fur over them, might in such case be an advantage; and if so, natural selection would aid the effects of disuse. (Charles Darwin, The Origin of Species)

=== Research ===
The blind forms of the Mexican tetra have proven popular subjects for scientists studying evolution: A recent study suggests that there are at least two distinct genetic lineages among the blind populations, arguing that these represent a case of convergent evolution.

One theory is that because of its dark habitat, the fish embryo saves energy it would normally use to develop eyes to develop other body parts, and this developmental choice would eventually dominate the population. This is called economical adaptation. However, studies have shown that blind cave fish embryos begin to grow eyes during development but then something actively stops this process and flesh grows over the partially grown eyes. Another theory is that some Mexican tetra randomly don't develop eyes (which is represented by broken genes in the fish's genome), and this lack of eyes spreads to the rest of the population despite having no advantage or disadvantage. This is called the unified neutral theory of biodiversity.

In one experiment studying eye development, University of Maryland scientists transplanted lenses from the eyes of sighted surface-form embryos into blind cave-form embryos, and vice versa. In the cave form, lens development begins within the first 24 hours of embryonic development, but quickly aborts, the lens cells dying; most of the rest of the eye structures never develop. Researchers found that the lens seemed to control the development of the rest of the eye, as the surface-form tetras which received cave-form lenses failed to develop eyes, while cave-form tetras which received surface-form lenses grew eyes with pupils, corneas, and irises. (It is not clear whether they possessed sight, however.)

The evolution of trichromatic color vision in primates occurred as the ancestors of modern monkeys, apes, and humans switched to diurnal (daytime) activity and began consuming fruits and leaves from flowering plants. (see-Evolution of color vision, Evolution of color vision in primates)

== See also ==
- Sudden acquired retinal degeneration, a disease that causes blindness in dogs
