= Evolution of color vision =

Origin and variation of colour vision across various lineages through geologic time

Color vision, a proximate adaptation of the vision sensory modality, allows for the discrimination of light based on its wavelength components. There are two physiological requirements for a visual system to discriminate wavelengths. There must be at least two different classes of photoreceptors sensitive to different ranges of the electromagnetic spectrum, and their outputs must be compared or contrasted with each other. This is because of the principle of univariance states that a single photoreceptor cannot unambiguously determine either the wavelength or intensity of incident light. But through comparisons of different photoreceptor classes, the ambiguity can be resolved. The evolutionary process leading to color vision in both humans and animals involves both the differentiation of photopigments to create different classes of cone cells, and the comparison between different cones in subsequent stages of visual processing.

== Improved Detection Sensitivity ==
The evolutionary process of switching from a single photopigment to two different pigments would have provided early ancestors with several advantages.

In one way, adding a new pigment would allow them to see a wider range of the electromagnetic spectrum. Secondly, new random connections would create wavelength opponency and the new wavelength opponent neurons would be much more sensitive than the non-wavelength opponent neurons. This is the result of some wavelength distributions favouring excitation instead of inhibition. Both excitation and inhibition would be features of a neural substrate during the formation of a second pigment. Overall, the advantage gained from increased sensitivity with wavelength opponency would open up opportunities for future exploitation by mutations and even further improvement.

== Invertebrates ==
Color vision requires a number of opsin molecules with different absorbance peaks, and at least three opsins were present in the ancestor of arthropods; chelicerates and pancrustaceans today possess color vision.

== Vertebrates ==
Researchers studying the opsin genes responsible for color-vision pigments have long known that four photopigment opsins exist in birds, reptiles and teleost fish. This indicates that the common ancestor of amphibians and amniotes (≈350 million years ago) had tetrachromatic vision — the ability to see four dimensions of color.

== Mammals ==
Today, most mammals possess dichromatic vision, corresponding to protanopia red–green color blindness. They can thus see violet, blue, green and yellow light, but cannot see ultraviolet or deep red light. This was probably a feature of the first mammalian ancestors, which were likely small, nocturnal, and burrowing.

At the time of the Cretaceous–Paleogene extinction event 66 million years ago, the burrowing ability probably helped mammals survive extinction. Mammalian species of the time had already started to differentiate, but were still generally small, comparable in size to shrews; this small size would have helped them to find shelter in protected environments.

== Monotremes and marsupials ==
It is postulated that some early monotremes, marsupials, and placentals were semiaquatic or burrowing, as there are multiple mammalian lineages with such habits today. Any burrowing or semiaquatic mammal would have had additional protection from Cretaceous–Paleogene boundary environmental stresses. However, many such species evidently possessed poor color vision in comparison with non-mammalian vertebrate species of the time, including reptiles, birds, and amphibians.

== Primates ==
Since the beginning of the Paleogene Period, surviving mammals enlarged, moving away by adaptive radiation from a burrowing existence and into the open, although most species kept their relatively poor color vision. Exceptions occur for some marsupials (which possibly kept their original color vision) and some primates—including humans. Primates, as an order of mammals, began to emerge around the beginning of the Paleogene Period.

Primates have re-developed trichromatic color vision since that time, by the mechanism of gene duplication, being under unusually high evolutionary pressure to develop color vision better than the mammalian standard. Ability to perceive red and orange hues allows tree-dwelling primates to discern them from green. This is particularly important for primates in the detection of red and orange fruit, as well as nutrient-rich new foliage, in which the red and orange carotenoids have not yet been masked by chlorophyll.

Another theory is that detecting skin flushing and thereby mood may have influenced the development of primate trichromate vision. The color red also has other effects on primate and human behavior, as discussed in the color psychology article.

Today, among simians, the catarrhines (Old World monkeys and apes, including humans) are routinely trichromatic—meaning that both males and females possess three opsins, sensitive to short-wave, medium-wave, and long-wave light—while, conversely, only a small fraction of platyrrhine primates (New World monkeys) are trichromats.

== Timeline ==
A study published in Biological Reviews proposes that animal color vision emerged approximately 500 million years ago. This timeline precedes the emergence of many brightly colored organisms, such as flowering plants, colorful vertebrates, and arthropods. The study suggests that the ability to perceive color developed before the widespread appearance of colorful stimuli in the environment.

This discovery has generated interest and discussion among scientists because it raises important questions about the evolutionary pressures that led to the development of color vision. Early forms of color vision may have been utilized for activities such as foraging, mate choice, or avoiding predators, even in a less colorful world.

== See also ==
- Evolution of color vision in primates
- Evolution of the eye
