= Evolution of color vision in primates =

Loss and regain of color vision during the evolution of primates

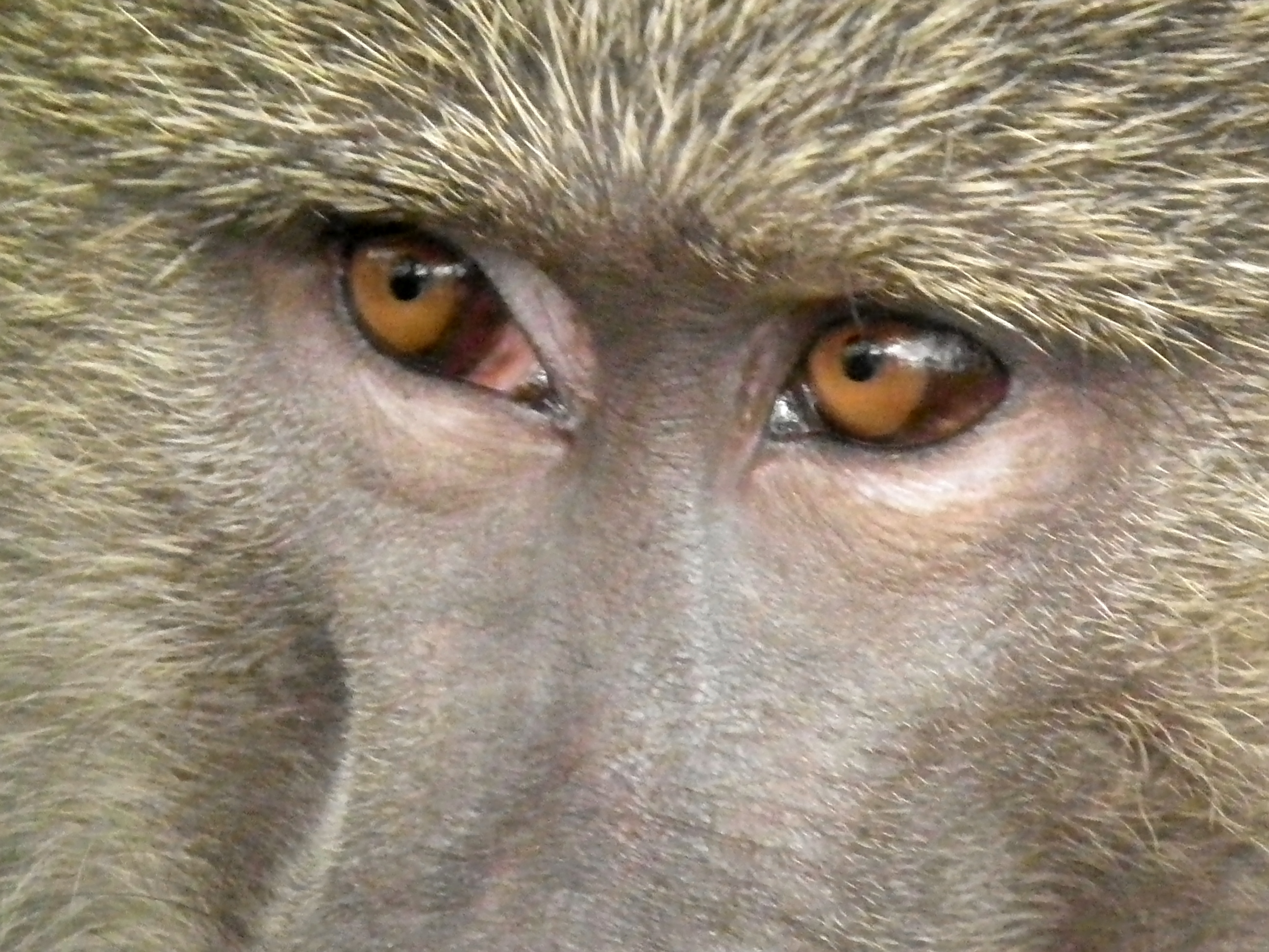
Baboons, like other old world monkeys and apes, have eyes which can discern blue, green and red wavelengths of light

The evolution of color vision in primates is highly unusual compared to most eutherian mammals. A remote vertebrate ancestor of primates possessed tetrachromacy, but nocturnal, warm-blooded, mammalian ancestors lost two of four cones in the retina at the time of dinosaurs. Most teleost fish, reptiles and birds are therefore tetrachromatic while most mammals are strictly dichromats, the exceptions being some primates and marsupials, who are trichromats, and many marine mammals, who are monochromats.

== Cones and opsins ==
While color vision is dependent on many factors, discussion of the evolution of color vision is typically simplified to two factors:

- the breadth of the visible spectrum (which wavelengths of light can be detected), and
- the dimensionality of the color gamut (e.g. dichromacy vs. tetrachromacy).

In vertebrates, both of these are almost perfectly correlated to an individual's cone complement.

The retina comprises several different classes of photoreceptors, including cone cells and rod cells. Rods usually do not contribute to color vision (except in mesopic conditions) and have not evolved significantly in the era of primates, so they will not be discussed here. It is the cone cells, which are used for photopic vision, that facilitate color vision.

Each type - or class - of cones is defined by its opsin, a protein fundamental to the visual cycle that tunes the cell to certain wavelengths of light. The opsins present in cone cells are specifically called photopsin. The spectral sensitivities of the opsins are dependent on their genetic sequence. The most important (and often only important for discussions of opsin evolution) parameter of the spectral sensitivity is the peak wavelength, i.e. the wavelength of light to which they are most sensitive. For example, a typical human L-opsin has a peak wavelength of 560 nm. The cone complement defines an individual's set of cones in their retina - usually consistent with the set of opsins in their genome.

The breadth of an individual's visual spectrum is equal to the minimum and maximum wavelengths to which at least one of their cones is sensitive. In vertebrates, the dimensionality of the color gamut is usually equal to the number of cones/opsins, though this simple equivalence breaks down for invertebrates.

=== Primate cone complement ===
The cone complements exhibited by primates can be monochromatic, dichromatic or trichromatic. The catarrhines (Old World monkeys and apes) are routine trichromats, meaning both males and females possess three opsins classes. In nearly all species of platyrrhines (New World monkeys) males and homozygous females are dichromats, while heterozygous females are trichromats, a condition known as allelic or polymorphic trichromacy. Among platyrrhines, the exceptions are Alouatta (routine trichromats) and Aotus (routine monochromats).

All primates with the exception of Aotus exhibit an S-opsin (short wave sensitive) in the cone most sensitive to blue light (S-cone). This opsin is encoded by an autosomal gene on chromosome 7. The other cones differ between primates.

=== Catarrhine cone complement ===
The taxa Catarrhini includes old world monkeys (e.g. baboons) and apes (e.g. humans). In addition to the S-opsin, catarrhine primates have two adjacent opsin genes on the X chromosome:

- M-opsin (middle wave sensitive, encoded by OPN1MW gene), the cone most sensitive to green light
- L-opsin (long wave sensitive, encoded by OPN1LW gene), the cone most sensitive to red light

=== Platyrrhine cone complement ===
The taxa Platyrhini includes new world monkeys (e.g. Squirrel monkeys). In addition to the S-opsin, trichromatic platyrrhine primates generally have only a single opsin gene locus, but it is polymorphic, with different alleles encoding opsins of different peak wavelength. Individuals homozygous for the gene will have only two opsin classes and therefore exhibit dichromacy. However, heterozygous individuals will have three opsin classes and therefore be trichromats. Since the gene is on the X-chromosome, of which males possess only one, all males are monozygous. They therefore always have 2 opsin classes and are dichromatic. Females can be either heterozygous or homozygous, so can be either dichromats or trichromats.

== Phylogenetics ==
=== Mammalian Ancestors ===
The common vertebrate ancestor (ca. 540MYA) had 4 photopsins in their complement (SWS1, SWS2, Rh2, LWS) and likely had tetrachromatic vision. Today, most other vertebrate classes have retained their 4 cones and exhibit tetrachromacy, including birds, reptiles, teleosts (fish) and amphibians. However, mammalian ancestors lost 2 of the 4 opsins due to the nocturnal bottleneck and most modern mammals are therefore dichromats, retaining only the SWS1 (UV–sensitive) and LWS (red–sensitive) opsins. There is little data indicating the advantages of UV-sensitivity in early mammals that led to the retention of SWS1 instead of SWS2 and Rh2 opsins.

Approximately 35 MYA the LWS class of opsins in catarrhine ancestors split into OPN1MW and OPN1LW. At about the same time, the SWS opsin shifted from its ancestral UV–sensitivity form to a violet-sensitive form with a peak wavelength of ~420 nm.

=== Evolutionary pathway of SWS1 ===
Mutagenesis experiments involving the Boreoeutherian ancestor to humans have shown that seven genetic mutations are linked to losing UV vision and gaining the blue light vision that most humans have today over the course of millions of years. These mutations: F46T, F49L, T52F, F86L, T93P, A114G and S118T, include 5040 potential pathways for the amino acid changes required to create genetic changes in the short wavelength sensitive, or blue opsin. Of the 5040 pathways, 335 have been deemed as possible trajectories for the evolution of blue opsin. It has been discovered that each individual mutation has no effect on its own, and that only multiple changes combined following an epistatic pattern in a specific order resulted in changes in the evolutionary direction of blue vision.

Incomplete trajectories, or evolutionary pathways, are shown to be caused by T52F mutations occurring first because T52F does not have a peak for the absorption of light within the entire visible region. T52F mutations are deemed to be structurally unstable, and the evolutionary path is immediately terminated. Having any of the other stable mutations occur first, including F46T, F49L, F86L, T93P, A114G or S118T, opens up the possibility of having 1032 out of 5042 potential trajectories open up to evolution. This is because having any of the other mutations occur first would allow for 134, 74, 252, 348, 102 and 122 potential pathways for mutations involving each of the remaining 6 mutants, equal to 1032 potential pathways for the evolution of short wavelength sensitive opsins to take place.

Studies using in vitro assays have shown that epistatic evolution took place in ancestral Boreoeutherian species with the 7 mutations on genetically reconstructed Boreoetherian short wavelength sensitive opsins. λmax values were shifted from a value of 357 nm to 411 nm , an increase which indicated that human short wavelength sensitive opsins did indeed evolve from ancestral Boreoeutherian species using these 7 mutations.

Further analysis has shown that 4008 out of the 5040 possible trajectories were terminated prematurely due to nonfunctional pigments that were dehydrated. Mutagenesis results also reveal that ancestral human short wavelength sensitive opsin remained UV-sensitive until about 80 million years ago, before gradually increasing its λmax by 20 nm 75 million years ago and 20 nm 45 million years ago. It eventually reached the current λmax of 430 nm 30 million years ago.

It is believed that middle and long wave sensitive pigments appeared after the final stages of short wavelength sensitive opsin pigments evolved, and that trichromatic vision was formed through interprotein epistasis.

Early mammal ultraviolet vision, or ultraviolet sensitivity, included sensitivity in the wavelength ranges between 350 nm and 430 nm . These wavelengths are shorter than visible light but longer than X-rays. In some rare cases, some modern day humans can see within the UV spectrum at wavelengths close to 310 nm .

In other animals that possess UV vision such as birds, ultraviolet sensitivity can be advantageous for courtship and reproductive success. This is because some birds have feathers with certain favorable colorations that can not be distinguished by human vision outside of the UV spectrum.

It has been theorized that λ max-shifts might have been required as human ancestors started to switch from leading nocturnal lifestyles to more diurnal lifestyles. This caused their vision to adjust to various twilight settings over time. To identify the path from which short wavelength opsins evolved, increases in absolute max values were used by researchers with a limitation of approximately |Δλmax|<25 nm per step. This allows for subdivision of the 1032 potential pathways that were generated by analysis of first mutations beginning with any of the stable mutants: F46T, F49L, F86L, T93P, A114G or S118T to be narrowed down to 335 potential pathways.

It was found that the last two mutations, F46T and T52F, occurred between 45 million and 30 million years ago as the absolute max for short wave length opsins was increasing from 400 nm to 430 nm .

=== Evolutionary pathway of LWS ===
Approximately 35MYA, ancestral Boreotherian LWS opsin class split into two opsin sub-classes, with one retaining the peak wavelength of 560 nm, equal to the ancestral value. The other LWS opsin decreased its peak wavelength to 530 nm and became the M-opsin, or green-sensitive opsin. The details of this split are disputed. Some evolutionary biologists believe that the L and M photopigments of catarrhines and platyrrhines had a common evolutionary origin; molecular studies demonstrate that the peak wavelengths of the three pigments in both sub-orders is the same. There are two popular hypotheses that explain the evolution of the primate vision differences from this common origin.

==== Polymorphism ====
The first hypothesis is that the two-gene (M and L) system of the catarrhine primates evolved from a crossing-over mechanism. Unequal crossing over between the chromosomes carrying alleles for L and M variants could have resulted in a separate L and M gene located on a single X chromosome. This hypothesis requires that the evolution of the polymorphic system of the platyrrhine pre-dates the separation of the Old World and New World monkeys.

This hypothesis proposes that this crossing-over event occurred in a heterozygous catarrhine female sometime after the platyrrhine/catarrhine divergence. Following the crossing-over, any male and female progeny receiving at least one X chromosome with both M and L genes would be trichromats. Single M or L gene X chromosomes would subsequently be lost from the catarrhine gene pool, assuring routine trichromacy.

==== Gene duplication ====
The alternate hypothesis is that opsin polymorphism arose in platyrrhines after they diverged from catarrhines. By this hypothesis, a single X-opsin allele was duplicated in catarrhines and catarrhine M and L opsins diverged later by mutations affecting one gene duplicate but not the other. Platyrrhine M and L opsins would have evolved by a parallel process, acting on the single opsin gene present to create multiple alleles. Geneticists use the "molecular clocks" technique to determine an evolutionary sequence of events. It deduces elapsed time from a number of minor differences in DNA sequences. Nucleotide sequencing of opsin genes suggests that the genetic divergence between New World primate opsin alleles (2.6%) is considerably smaller than the divergence between Old World primate genes (6.1%). Hence, the New World primate color vision alleles are likely to have arisen after Old World gene duplication. It is also proposed that the polymorphism in the opsin gene might have arisen independently through point mutation on one or more occasions, and that the spectral tuning similarities are due to convergent evolution. Despite the homogenization of genes in the New World monkeys, there has been a preservation of trichromacy in the heterozygous females suggesting that the critical amino acid that define these alleles have been maintained.

== Ultimate causation hypotheses ==
There exist several theories for the main evolutionary pressure that caused primates to evolve trichromatic color vision, namely the red-green opponent channel.

=== Fruit theory ===
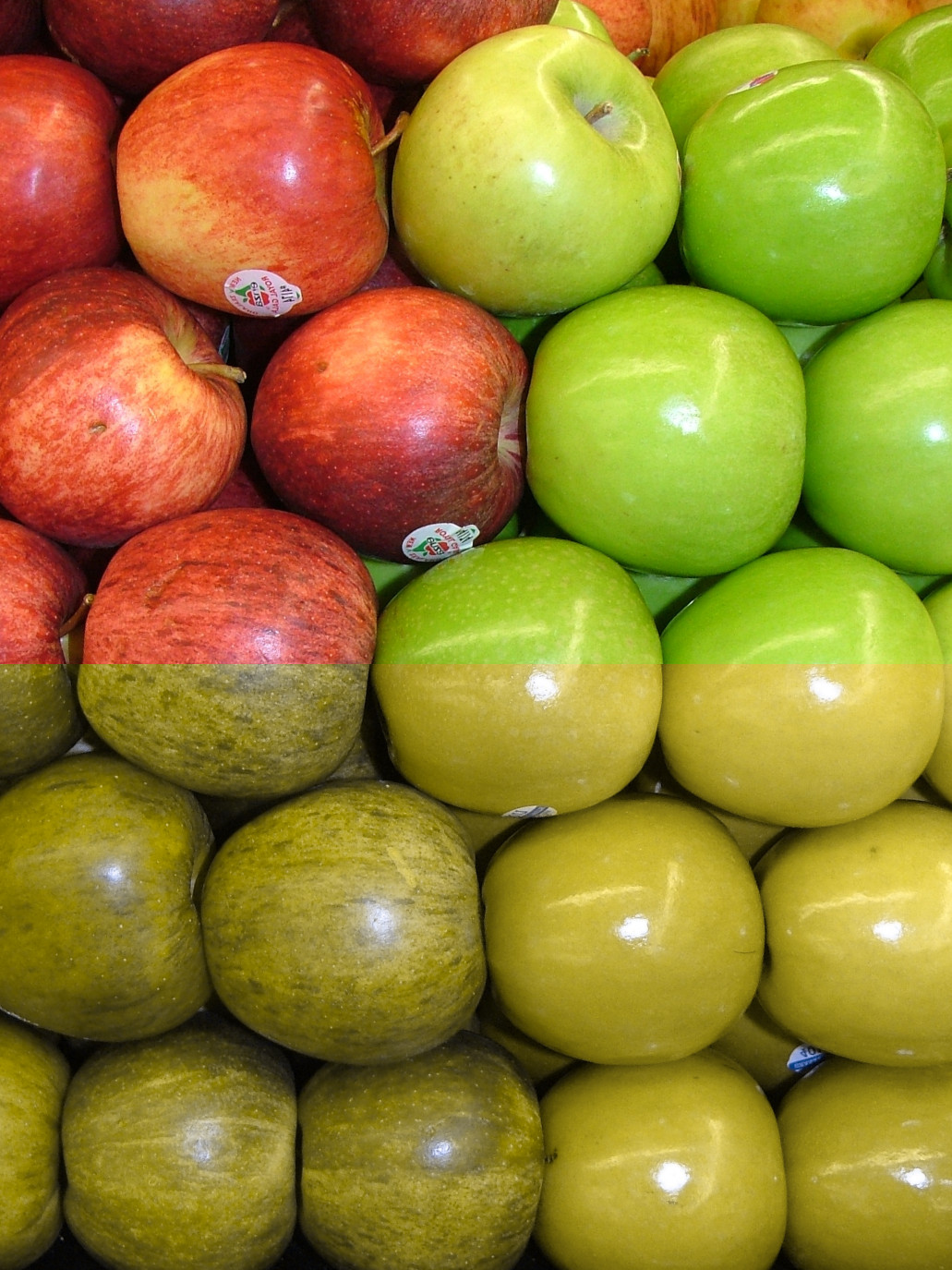
Simulation of trichromatic (top half of photo) and dichromatic perception (lower half) of red and green apples

This theory postulates that trichromacy became favorable due to the increased ability to find ripe fruit against a foliage background. Research has found that the spectral separation between the L and the M cones is closely proportional to the optimal for detection of many colors of fruit (red) against foliage (green). The reflectance spectra of fruits and leaves naturally eaten by the Alouatta seniculus were analyzed and found that the sensitivity in the L and M cone pigments is optimal for detecting fruit among leaves.

While the "fruit theory" holds much data to support its reasoning, some recent research has criticized this theory. One study shows that the difference in the fruit-spotting task between trichromats and dichromats is largest when the tree is far away (~12m), inferring that the evolutionary pressure may have been on spotting fruit trees from a distance, rather than picking fruit. Those findings were based upon the fact that there is a larger variety of background S/(L+M) and luminance values under long-distance viewing. However, spatiochromatic properties of the red-green system of color vision may be optimized for detecting any red objects against a background of leaves at relatively small viewing distances equal to that of a typical "grasping distance."

=== Young leaf hypothesis ===
This theory is centered around the idea that the benefit for possessing the different M and L cone pigments are so that during times of fruit shortages, an animal's ability to identify the younger and more reddish leaves, which contain higher amounts of protein, will lead to a higher rate of survival. In addition, a prominent visual discriminant between young and mature leaves is their red-green color channel, which is only discernible to trichromats. This theory supports the evidence showing that trichromatic color vision originated in Africa, as figs and palms are scarce in this environment thus increasing the need for this color vision selection. However, this theory does not explain the selection for trichromacy polymorphisms seen in dichromatic species that are not from Africa.

=== Evolution of olfactory systems ===
The sense of smell may have been a contributing factor in selection of color vision. One controversial study suggests that the loss of olfactory receptor genes coincided with the evolved trait of full trichromatic vision; this study has been challenged, and two of the authors retracted it. The theory is that as sense of smell deteriorated, selective pressures increased for the evolution of trichromacy for foraging. In addition, the mutation of trichromacy could have made the need for pheromone communication redundant and thus prompted the loss of this function.

Overall, research has not shown that the concentration of olfactory receptors is directly related to color vision acquisition. Research suggests that the species Alouatta does not share the same characteristics of pheromone transduction pathway pseudogenes that humans and Old World monkeys possess and leading howler monkeys to maintain both pheromone communication systems and full trichromatic vision.

Therefore, trichromacy alone does not lead to the loss of pheromone communication but rather a combination of environmental factors. Nonetheless research shows a significant negative correlation between the two traits in the majority of trichromatic species.

=== Skin tone ===
Trichromacy may also be evolutionarily favorable in recognizing changes in skin tone. The spectral sensitivity of M- and L-opsins maximize sensitivity to changes in skin color that correspond to blood oxygen levels.

Recognizing changes in skin tone that indicate states of health would be one advantage. Dichromatic humans report trouble with recognizing sunburn, rash, pallor and jaundice. Recognizing when offspring are sick allows parents to care for or provide treatment to them. Likewise, mate choice that excludes sick individuals increases the viability of offspring. Similarly, other causes of skin tone change such as blushing or rump-reddening convey important information between potential sexual partners. Therefore, the formation of trichromatic color vision in certain primate species may have been beneficial in recognizing the state of health/fertility of others.

== Anomalies in New World monkeys ==
=== Aotus and Alouatta ===
There are two noteworthy genera within the New World monkeys that exhibit how different environments with different selective pressures can affect the type of vision in a population. For example, the night monkeys (Aotus) have lost their S photopigments and polymorphic M/L opsin gene. Because these anthropoids are and were nocturnal, operating most often in a world where color is less important, selection pressure on color vision relaxed. On the opposite side of the spectrum, diurnal howler monkeys (Alouatta) have reinvented routine trichromacy through a relatively recent gene duplication of the M/L gene. This duplication has allowed trichromacy for both sexes; its X chromosome gained two loci to house both the green allele and the red allele. The recurrence and spread of routine trichromacy in howler monkeys suggests that it provides them with an evolutionary advantage.

Howler monkeys are perhaps the most folivorous of the New World monkeys. Fruits make up a relatively small portion of their diet, and the type of leaves they consume (young, nutritive, digestible, often reddish in color), are best detected by a red-green signal. Field work exploring the dietary preferences of howler monkeys suggest that routine trichromacy was environmentally selected for as a benefit to folivore foraging.

== See also ==
- Evolution of color vision
- Evolution of the eye
- Opsin
- Opponent process
- Color blindness
