= William Rushton =

William Rushton may refer to:

- W. A. H. Rushton (1901–1980), British physiologist
- Willie Rushton (1937–1996), British comedian
