= Dichromacy =

Type of color vision

Typical cone cell spectral sensitivity of organisms with dichromatic color vision

Dichromacy (from Greek di 'two' and chromo 'color') is the state of having two types of functioning photoreceptors, called cone cells, in the eyes. Organisms with dichromacy are called dichromats. Dichromats require only two primary colors to be able to represent their visible gamut. By comparison, trichromats need three primary colors, and tetrachromats need four. Likewise, every color in a dichromat's gamut can be evoked with monochromatic light. By comparison, every color in a trichromat's gamut can be evoked with a combination of monochromatic light and white light.

Dichromacy in humans is a color vision deficiency in which one of the three cone cells is absent or not functioning and color is thereby reduced to two dimensions.

== Perception ==
Dichromatic color vision is enabled by two types of cone cells with different spectral sensitivities and the neural framework to compare the excitation of the different cone cells. The resulting color vision is simpler than typical human trichromatic color vision, and much simpler than tetrachromatic color vision, typical of birds and fish.

A dichromatic color space can be defined by only two primary colors. When these primary colors are also the unique hues, then the color space contains the entire gamut. In dichromacy, the unique hues can be evoked by exciting only a single cone at a time, e.g. monochromatic light near the extremes of the visible spectrum. A dichromatic color space can also be defined by non-unique hues, but the color space will not contain the entire gamut. For comparison, a trichromatic color space requires three primary colors to be defined. However, even when choosing three pure spectral colors as the primaries, the resulting color space will never encompass the entire trichromatic gamut.

The color vision of dichromats can be represented in a 2-dimensional plane, where one coordinate represents brightness, and the other coordinate represents hue. However, the perception of hue is not directly analogous to trichromatic hue, but rather a spectrum diverging from white (neutral) in the middle to two unique hues at the extreme, e.g. blue and yellow. Unlike trichromats, white (experienced when both cone cells are equally excited) can be evoked by monochromatic light. This means that dichromats see white in the rainbow.

== Humans ==
Dichromacy in humans is a form of color blindness (color vision deficiency). Normal human color vision is trichromatic, so dichromacy is achieved by losing functionality of one of the three cone cells. It is rarer than anomalous trichromacy. The classification of human dichromacy depends on which cone is missing:

- Protanopia is a severe form of red-green color blindness, in which the L-cone is absent. It is sex-linked and affects about 1% of males. Colors of confusion include blue/purple and green/yellow.
- Deuteranopia is a severe form of red-green color blindness, in which the M-cone is absent. It is sex-linked and affects about 1% of males. Color vision is very similar to protanopia.
- Tritanopia is a severe form of blue-yellow color blindness, in which the S-cone is absent. It is much rarer than the other types, occurring in about 1 in 100,000, but is not sex-linked, so affects females and males at similar rates. They tend to confuse greens and blues, and yellow can appear pink.
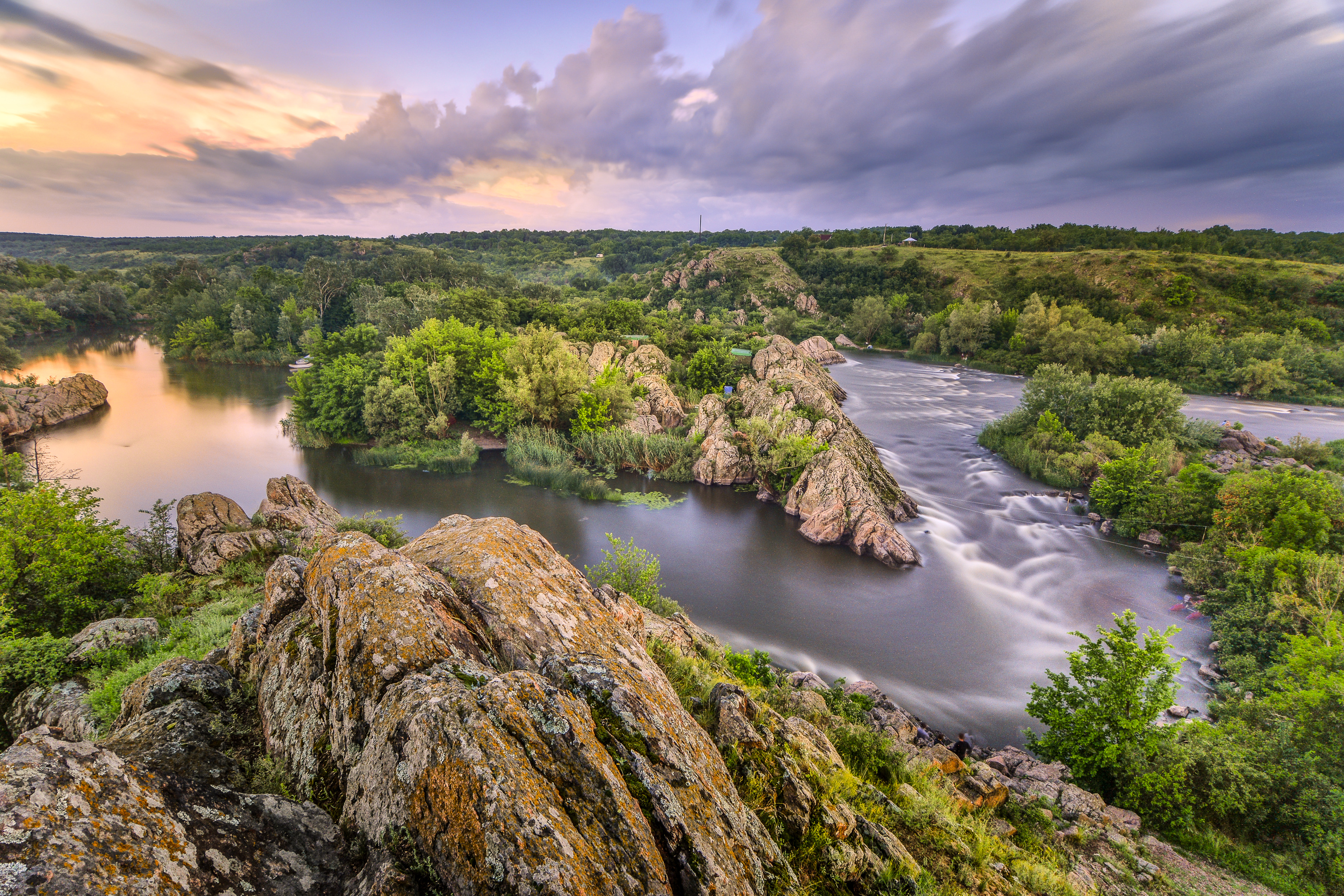
Normal sight

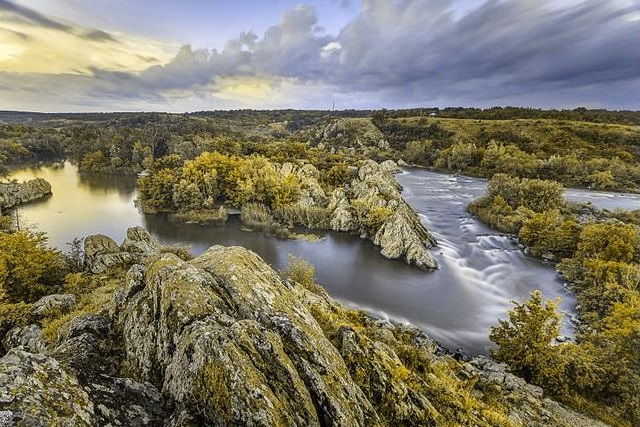
Deuteranopic sight

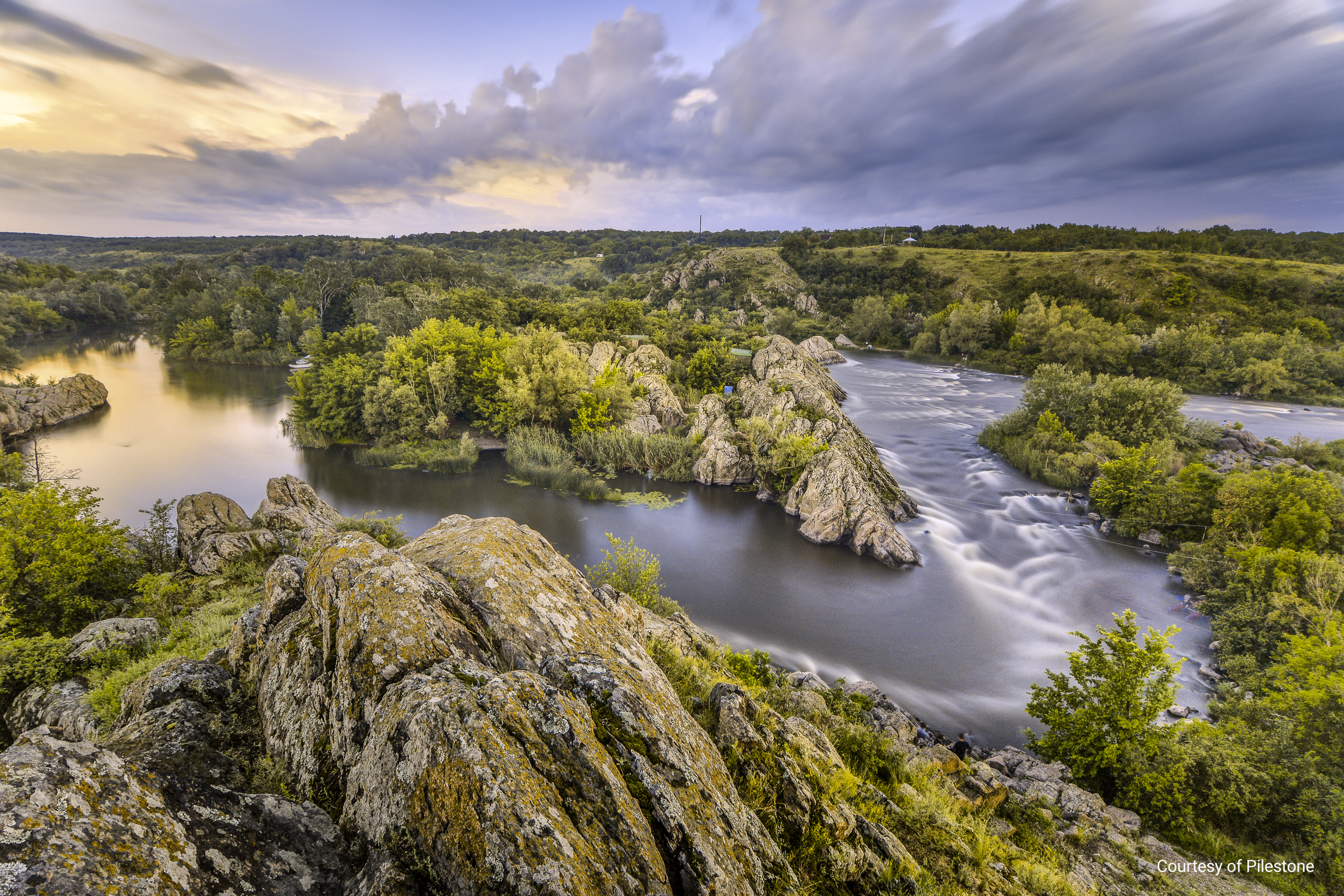
Protanopic sight

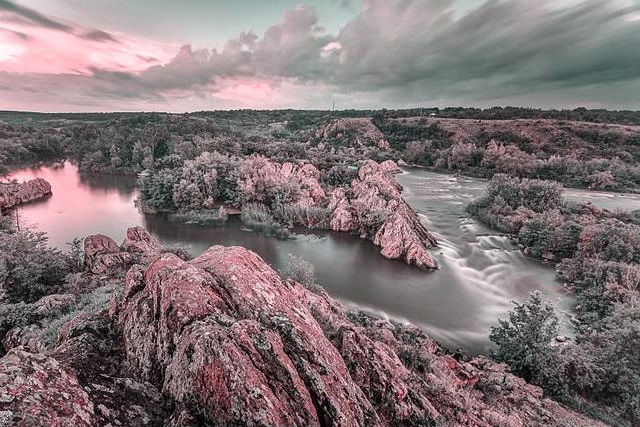
Tritanopic sight

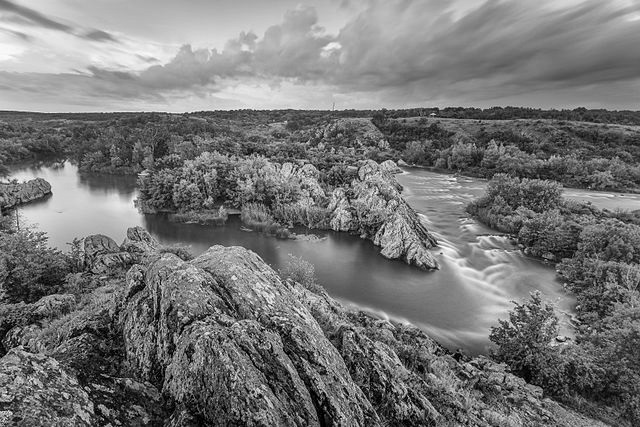
Monochromatic sight

=== Diagnosis ===
The three determining elements of a dichromatic opponent-color space are the missing color, the null-luminance plane, and the null-chrominance plane. The description of the phenomena itself does not indicate the color that is impaired to the dichromat, however, it does provide enough information to identify the fundamental color space, the colors that are seen by the dichromat. This is based on testing both the null-chrominance plane and null-luminance plane which intersect on the missing color. The cones excited to a corresponding color in the color space are visible to the dichromat and those that are not excited are the missing colors.

=== Color detecting abilities of dichromats ===
According to color vision researchers at the Medical College of Wisconsin (including Jay Neitz), each of the three standard color-detecting cones in the retina of trichromats – blue, green and red – can pick up about 100 different gradations of color. If each detector is independent of the others, the total number of colors discernible by an average human is their product (100 × 100 × 100), i.e. about 1 million; Nevertheless, other researchers have put the number at upwards of 2.3 million. The same calculation suggests that a dichromat (such as a human with red-green color blindness) would be able to distinguish about 100 × 100 = 10,000 different colors, but no such calculation has been verified by psychophysical testing.

Furthermore, dichromats have a significantly higher threshold than trichromats for colored stimuli flickering at low (1 Hz) frequencies, meaning they underperform trichromats. At higher (10 or 16 Hz) frequencies, dichromats perform as well as or better than trichromats. This means such animals would still observe the flicker instead of a temporally fused visual perception as is the case in human movie watching at a high enough frame rate.

== Mammals ==
Until the 1960s, popular belief held that most mammals outside of primates were monochromats. In the last half-century, however, a focus on behavioral and genetic testing of mammals has accumulated extensive evidence of dichromatic color vision in a number of mammalian orders. Mammals are now usually assumed to be dichromats (possessing S- and L-cones), with monochromats viewed as the exceptions.

The common vertebrate ancestor, extant during the Cambrian, was tetrachromatic, possessing 4 distinct opsins classes. Early mammalian evolution would see the loss of two of these four opsins, due to the nocturnal bottleneck, as dichromacy may improve an animal's ability to distinguish colors in dim light. Placental mammals are therefore – as a rule – dichromatic.

The exceptions to this rule of dichromatic vision in placental mammals are old world monkeys and apes, which re-evolved trichromacy, and marine mammals (both pinnipeds and cetaceans) which are cone monochromats. New World monkeys are a partial exception: in most species, males are dichromats, and about 60% of females are trichromats, but the owl monkeys are cone monochromats, and both sexes of howler monkeys are trichromats.

Trichromacy has been retained or re-evolved in marsupials, where trichromatic vision is widespread. Recent genetic and behavioral evidence suggests the South American marsupial Didelphis albiventris is dichromatic, with only two classes of cone opsins having been found within the genus Didelphis.

== See also ==
- Pentachromacy
- Mantis shrimp (dodecachromats)
- RG color space

== Sources ==
- Scheibner, H.; Cleveland, S. (1997). "Dichromacy characterized by chrominance planes". Vision Research. 38 (1): 3403–3407. doi:10.1016/s0042-6989(97)00373-8. PMID 9893856.
