= Mycosporine-like amino acid =

Mycosporine-like amino acids (MAAs) are small secondary metabolites produced by organisms that live in environments with high volumes of sunlight, usually marine environments. The exact number of compounds within this class of natural products is yet to be determined, since they have only relatively recently been discovered and novel molecular species are constantly being discovered; however, to date their number is around 30. They are commonly described as "microbial sunscreens" although their function is believed not to be limited to sun protection. MAAs represent high potential in cosmetics, and biotechnological applications. Indeed, their UV-absorbing properties would allow to create products derived from natural photoprotectors, potentially harmless to the environment and efficient against UV damage.

== Background ==
MAAs are widespread in the microbial world and have been reported in many microorganisms including heterotrophic bacteria, cyanobacteria, microalgae, ascomycetous and basidiomycetous fungi, as well as some multicellular organisms such as macroalgae and marine animals. Most research done on MAAs is on their light absorbing and radiation protecting properties. The first thorough description of MAAs was done in cyanobacteria living in a high UV radiation environment. The major unifying characteristic among all MAAs is UV light absorption. All MAAs absorb UV light that can be destructive to biological molecules (DNA, proteins, etc.). Though most MAA research is done on their photo-protective capabilities, they are also considered to be multi-functional secondary metabolites that have many cellular functions. MAAs are effective antioxidant molecules and are able to stabilize free radicals within their ring structure. In addition to protecting cells from mutation via UV radiation and free radicals, MAAs are able to boost cellular tolerance to desiccation, salt stress, and heat stress.

== Chemistry ==
Mycosporine–like amino acids are rather small molecules (<400 Da). The structures of over 30 MAAs have been resolved and all contain a central cyclohexenone or cyclohexenimine ring and a wide variety of substitutions. The ring structure is thought to absorb UV light and accommodate free radicals. All MAAs absorb ultraviolet wavelengths, typically between 310 and 362 nm. They are considered to be amongst the strongest natural absorbers of UV radiation. It is this light absorbing property that allows MAAs to protect cells from the harmful UV-B and UV-A components of sunlight. Biosynthetic pathways of MAAs depend on the specific MAA molecule and the organism that is producing it. These biosynthetic pathways often share common enzymes and metabolic intermediates with pathways of the primary metabolism. An example is the shikimate pathway that is classically used to produce the aromatic amino acids (phenylalanine, tyrosine and tryptophan); with many intermediates and enzymes from this pathway utilized in MAA biosynthesis.

== Examples ==
name	peak absorbance nm	systematic name	Chemspider
Asterina-330	330	{[(3E)-5-Hydroxy-3-[(2-hydroxyethyl)iminio]-5-(hydroxymethyl)-2-methoxy-1-cyclohexen-1-yl]amino}acetate	10475832
Euhalothece-362	362		
Mycosporine-2-glycine	334	[(E)-{3-[(Carboxymethyl)amino]-5-hydroxy-5-(hydroxymethyl)-2-methoxy-2-cyclohexen-1-ylidene}amino]acetic acid	10474079
Mycosporine-glycine	310	N-[(5S)-5-Hydroxy-5-(hydroxymethyl)-2-methoxy-3-oxo-1-cyclohexen-1-yl]glycine	10476943
Mycosporine-glycine-valine	335		
Mycosporine-glutamic acid-glycine	330		
Mycosporine-methylamine-serine	327		
Mycosporine-methylamine-threonine	327		
Mycosporine-taurine	309		
Palythenic acid	337		
Palythene	360	[(E)-{5-Hydroxy-5-(hydroxymethyl)-2-methoxy-3-[(1E)-1-propen-1-ylamino]-2-cyclohexen-1-ylidene}ammonio]acetate	10475813
Palythine	320	N-[5-Hydroxy-5-(hydroxymethyl)-3-imino-2-methoxycyclohex-1-en-1-yl]glycine	10272813
Palythine-serine	320	N-[5-Hydroxy-5-(hydroxymethyl)-3-imino-2-methoxy-1-cyclohexen-1-yl]serine	10476937
Palythine-serine-sulfate	320		
Palythinol	332		
Porphyra-334	334		29390215
Shinorine	334		
Usujirene	357		

== Functions ==
=== Ultraviolet light responses ===
==== Protection from UV radiation ====
Ultraviolet UV-A and UV-B radiation is harmful to living systems. An important tool used to deal with UV exposure is the biosynthesis of small-molecule sunscreens. MAAs have been implicated in UV radiation protection. The genetic basis for this implication comes from the observed induction of MAA synthesis when organisms are exposed to UV radiation. This has been observed in aquatic yeasts, cyanobacteria, marine dinoflagellates and some Antarctic diatoms. MAAs have also been identified in 572 species of other algae : 45 species in Chlorophyta, 41 species in Phaeophyta, 486 species in Rhodophyta which also present anti-aging, anti-inflammatory, antioxidative and wound healing properties. When MAAs absorb UV light the energy is dissipated as heat. UV-B photoreceptors have been identified in cyanobacteria as the molecules responsible for the UV light induced responses, including synthesis of MAAs. Helioguard™365 containing Porphyra-334 and shinorine derived from Porphyra umbilicalis is already a creme on the market were developed by Mibelle AG biochemistry and shows preventive effects against UVA. An MAA known as palythine, derived from seaweed, has been found to protect human skin cells from UV radiation even in low concentrations.

"MAAs, in addition to their environmental benefits, appear to be multifunctional photoprotective compounds," says Dr. Karl Lawrence, lead author of a paper on the research. "They work through the direct absorption of UVR [ultraviolet radiation] photons, much like the synthetic filters. They also act as potent antioxidants, which is an important property as exposure to solar radiation induces high levels of oxidative stress, and this is something not seen in synthetic filters."

==== Protection from oxidative damage ====
Some MAAs protect cells from reactive oxygen species (i.e. singlet oxygen, superoxide anions, hydroperoxyl radicals, and hydroxyl radicals). Reactive oxygen species can be created during photosynthesis; further supporting the idea that MAAs provide protection from UV light. Mycosporine-glycine is a MAA that provides antioxidant protection even before Oxidative stress response genes and antioxidant enzymes are induced. MAA-glycine (mycosporine-glycine) is able to quench singlet oxygen and hydroxyl radicals very quickly and efficiently. Some oceanic microbial ecosystems are exposed to high concentrations of oxygen and intense light; these conditions are likely to generate high levels of reactive oxygen species. In these ecosystems, MAA-rich cyanobacteria may be providing antioxidant activity.

==== Accessory pigments in photosynthesis ====
MAAs are able to absorb UV light. A study published in 1976 demonstrated that an increase in MAA content was associated with an increase in photosynthetic respiration. Further studies done in marine cyanobacteria showed that the MAAs synthesized in response to UV-B correlated with an increase in photosynthetic pigments. Though not absolute proof, these findings do implicate MAAs as accessory pigments to photosynthesis.

==== Photoreceptors ====
The eyes for the mantis shrimp contain four different kinds of mycosporine-like amino acids as filters, which combined with two different visual pigments assist the eye to detect six different bands of ultraviolet light. Three of the filter MAAs are identified with porphyra-334, mycosporine-gly, and gadusol.

=== Environmental stress responses ===
==== Salt stress ====
Osmotic stress is defined as difficulty maintaining proper fluids in the cell within a hypertonic or hypotonic environment. MAAs accumulate within a cell's cytoplasm and contribute to the osmotic pressure within a cell, thus relieving pressure from salt stress in a hypertonic environment. As evidence of this, MAAs are seldom found in large quantities in cyanobacteria living in freshwater environments. However, in saline and hypertonic environments, cyanobacteria often contain high concentrations of MAAs. The same phenomenon was noted for some halotolerant fungi. But, the concentration of MAAs within cyanobacteria living in hyper-saline environments is far from the amount required to balance the salinity. Therefore, additional osmotic solutes must be present as well.

==== Desiccation stress ====
Desiccation (drought) stress is defined as conditions where water becomes the growth limiting factor. MAAs have been reportedly found in high concentrations in many microorganisms exposed to drought stress. Particularly cyanobacteria species that are exposed to desiccation, UV radiation and oxidation stress have been shown to possess MAA's in an extracellular matrix. However it has been shown that MAAs do not provide sufficient protection against high doses of UV radiation.

==== Thermal stress ====
Thermal (heat) stress is defined as temperatures lethal or inhibitory towards growth. MAA concentrations have been shown to be up-regulated when an organism is under thermal stress. Multipurpose MAAs could also be compatible solutes under freezing conditions, because a high incidence of MAA producing organisms have been reported in cold aquatic environments.
