= Trichromacy =

Possessing of three independent channels for conveying color information

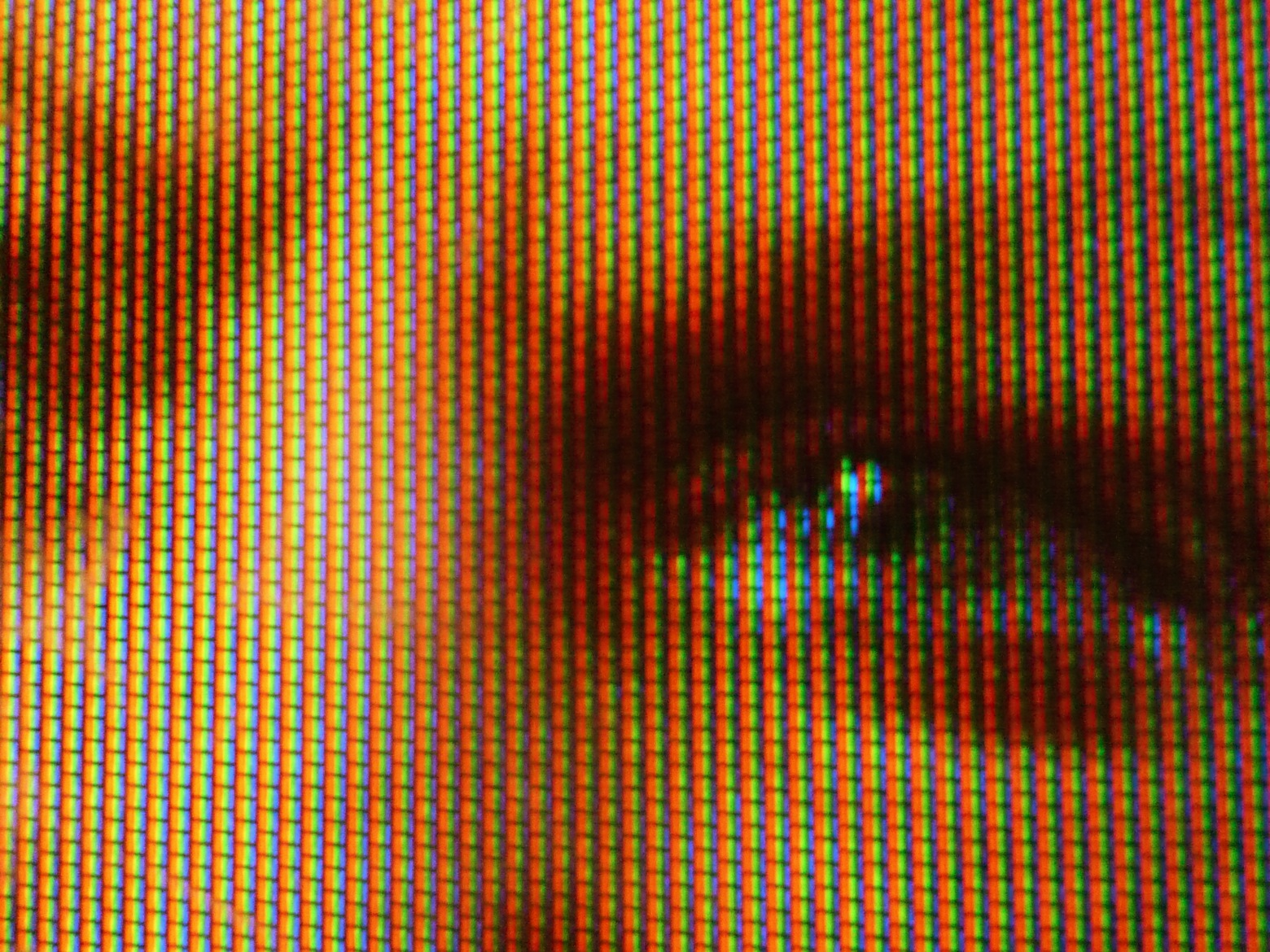
Close-up of a trichromatic in-line shadow mask CRT display, which creates most visible colors through combinations and different levels of the three primary colors: red, green and blue

Trichromacy or trichromatism is the possession of three independent channels for conveying color information, derived from the three different types of cone cells in the eye. Organisms with trichromacy are called trichromats.

The normal explanation of trichromacy is that the organism's retina contains three types of color receptors (called cone cells in vertebrates) with different absorption spectra. In actuality, the number of such receptor types may be greater than three, since different types may be active at different light intensities. In vertebrates with three types of cone cells, at low light intensities the rod cells may contribute to color vision.

== Humans and other animals that are trichromats ==
Humans and some other mammals have evolved trichromacy based partly on pigments inherited from early vertebrates. In fish and birds, for example, four pigments are used for vision. These extra cone receptor visual pigments detect energy of other wavelengths, sometimes including ultraviolet. Eventually two of these pigments were lost (in placental mammals) and another was gained, resulting in trichromacy among some primates. Humans and closely related primates are usually trichromats, as are some of the females of most species of New World monkeys, and both male and female howler monkeys.

Recent research suggests that trichromacy may also be quite general among marsupials. A study conducted regarding trichromacy in Australian marsupials suggests the medium wavelength sensitivity (MWS), cones of the honey possum (Tarsipes rostratus) and the fat-tailed dunnart (Sminthopsis crassicaudata) are features coming from the inherited reptilian retinal arrangement. Another study used behavioral tests, genetic analyses, and immunohistochemistry and found trichromacy and ultraviolet vision in nocturnal sugar gliders (Petaurus breviceps). The possibility of trichromacy in marsupials potentially has another evolutionary basis than that of primates. Further biological and behavioural tests may verify if trichromacy is a common characteristic of marsupials.

Most other mammals are currently thought to be dichromats, with only two types of cone (though limited trichromacy is possible at low light levels where the rods and cones are both active). Most studies of carnivores, as of other mammals, reveal dichromacy; examples include the domestic dog, the ferret, and the spotted hyena. Some species of insects (such as honeybees) are also trichromats, being sensitive to ultraviolet, blue and green instead of blue, green and red.

Research indicates that trichromacy allows animals to distinguish brightly colored fruit and young leaves from other vegetation that is not beneficial to their survival. Another theory is that detecting skin flushing and thereby mood may have influenced the development of primate trichromate vision. The color red also has other effects on primate and human behavior as discussed in the color psychology article.

== Types of cones specifically found in primates ==
Primates are the only known placental mammalian trichromats. Their eyes include three different kinds of cones, each containing a different photopigment (opsin). Their peak sensitivities lie in the blue (short-wavelength S cones), green (medium-wavelength M cones) and yellow-green (long-wavelength L cones) regions of the color spectrum. S cones make up 5–10% of the cones and form a regular mosaic. Special bipolar and ganglion cells pass those signals from S cones and there is evidence that they have a separate signal pathway through the thalamus to the visual cortex as well. On the other hand, the L and M cones are hard to distinguish by their shapes or other anatomical means – their opsins differ in only 15 out of 363 amino acids, so no one has yet succeeded in producing specific antibodies to them. But Mollon and Bowmaker did find that L cones and M cones are randomly distributed and are in equal numbers.

== Mechanism of trichromatic color vision ==
Normalised responsivity spectra of human cone cells

Illustration of color metamerism: In column 1, a ball is illuminated by monochromatic light. Multiplying the spectrum by the cones' spectral sensitivity curves gives the response for each cone type. In column 2, metamerism is used to simulate the scene with blue, green and red LEDs, giving a similar response.

Trichromatic color vision is the ability of humans and some other animals to see different colors, mediated by interactions among three types of color-sensing cone cells. The trichromatic color theory began in the 18th century, when Thomas Young proposed that color vision was a result of three different photoreceptor cells. From the middle of the 19th century, in his Treatise on Physiological Optics, Hermann von Helmholtz later expanded on Young's ideas using color-matching experiments which showed that people with normal vision needed three wavelengths to create the normal range of colors. Physiological evidence for trichromatic theory was later given by Gunnar Svaetichin (1956).

Each of the three types of cones in the retina of the eye contains a different type of photosensitive pigment, which is composed of a transmembrane protein called opsin and a light-sensitive molecule called 11-cis retinal. Each different pigment is especially sensitive to a certain wavelength of light (that is, the pigment is most likely to produce a cellular response when it is hit by a photon with the specific wavelength to which that pigment is most sensitive). The three types of cones are L, M, and S, which have pigments that respond best to light of long (especially 560 nm), medium (530 nm), and short (420 nm) wavelengths respectively.

Since the likelihood of response of a given cone varies not only with the wavelength of the light that hits it but also with its intensity, the brain would not be able to discriminate different colors if it had input from only one type of cone. Thus, interaction between at least two types of cone is necessary to produce the ability to perceive color. With at least two types of cones, the brain can compare the signals from each type and determine both the intensity and color of the light. For example, moderate stimulation of a medium-wavelength cone cell could mean that it is being stimulated by very bright red (long-wavelength) light, or by not very intense yellowish-green light. But very bright red light would produce a stronger response from L cones than from M cones, while not very intense yellowish light would produce a stronger response from M cones than from other cones. Thus trichromatic color vision is accomplished by using combinations of cell responses.

It is estimated that the average human can distinguish up to ten million different colors.

== See also ==
- Dichromacy
- Evolution of color vision in primates
- LMS color space
- Mantis shrimp (dodecachromats)
- Monochromacy
- Pentachromacy
- Tetrachromacy
- Visual system
- Young–Helmholtz theory
