= W. A. H. Rushton =

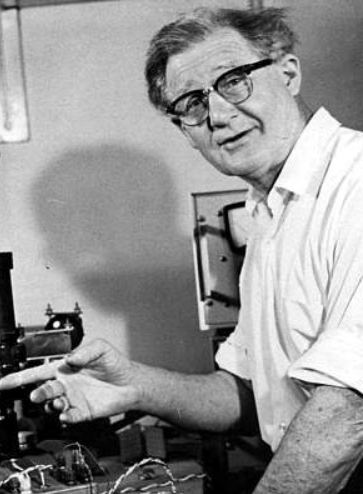
- Born: 8 December 1901
- Died: 21 June 1980 (aged 78)
- Occupations: Physiologist, psychical researcher

William Albert Hugh Rushton FRS (8 December 1901 – 21 June 1980) was professor of Physiology at Trinity College, Cambridge. His main interest lay in colour vision and his Principle of Univariance is of seminal importance in the study of perception.

== Education ==
Rushton was educated at Gresham's School, Holt, and the University of Cambridge. A student at Pembroke College, he later held a fellowship at Emmanuel before obtaining a fellowship at Trinity. He was a keen musician, playing violin and viola, and later bassoon; he also composed a few pieces, and had some instruction from Gustav Holst. In 1930 he married Marjorie Kendrick, an oboist; their house was accordingly called 'Shawms'.

== Principle of Univariance ==
In his lecture "Pigments and signals in colour vision" he stated it thus: "The output of a receptor depends upon its quantum catch, but not upon what quanta are caught."

This means that one and the same visual receptor cell can be excited by different combinations of wavelength and intensity, so that the brain can not know the colour of that point of the retinal picture.

== Psychical research ==
Rushton held an interest in parapsychology. From 1969 to 1971 he was the president of the Society for Psychical Research.

He was known for suggesting natural explanations for alleged paranormal phenomena. He revealed how the device of Ted Serios known as a "gizmo" could have been utilized to produce fraudulent psychic photographs. He suggested that it was light that formed the photographs from a luminous picture placed in front of the camera lens hidden in the gizmo. Rushton successfully replicated the Serios phenomenon by holding a little reflecting prism that contained a microfilm picture against the camera lens.

== Honours ==
- 1931 Beit Memorial Fellowship
- 1948 Fellow of the Royal Society
- 1968 Foreign Member of the Royal Swedish Academy of Sciences
- 1969 Honorary DSc of Case Western Reserve University
- 1970 Royal Medal of the Royal Society
