= Gadusol =

Names
- IUPAC name 3,4,5-trihydroxy-5-(hydroxymethyl)-2-methoxycyclohex-2-en-1-one

Identifiers
CAS Number	76663-30-4
3D model (JSmol)	Interactive image
ChEBI	CHEBI:172445
ChemSpider	169841
PubChem CID	195955
CompTox Dashboard (EPA)	DTXSID00997986
- InChI: InChI=1S/C8H12O6/c1-14-6-4(10)2-8(13,3-9)7(12)5(6)11/h7,9,11-13H,2-3H2,1H3 Key: KENOUOLPKKQXMX-UHFFFAOYSA-N
- SMILES: COC1=C(C(C(CC1=O)(CO)O)O)O

Properties
Chemical formula	C_{8}H_{12}O_{6}
Molar mass	204.178 g·mol^{−1}
- Except where otherwise noted, data are given for materials in their standard state (at 25 °C [77 °F], 100 kPa). Infobox references

Gadusol is a secondary metabolite and natural sunscreen produced by various organisms, including marine vertebrates and invertebrates, amphibians, reptiles, and birds.

It functions by absorbing ultraviolet radiation through its conjugated ring structure, blocking it from damaging biomolecules. Gladusol is closely related to the mycosporine-like amino acid family, a group of metabolites primarily produced by organisms in high-sunlight environments that absorb UV radiation. Structurally, gadusol is a substituted cyclohexenone.
