= Tetrachromacy =

Type of color vision with four types of cone cells

The four pigments in a bird's cone cells (in this example, estrildid finches) extend the range of color vision into the ultraviolet.

Tetrachromacy (from Ancient Greek tetra, meaning "four" and chroma, meaning "color") is the condition of possessing four independent channels for conveying color information, or possessing four types of cone cell in the eye. Organisms with tetrachromacy are called tetrachromats.

In tetrachromatic organisms, the sensory color space is four-dimensional, meaning that matching the sensory effect of arbitrarily chosen spectra of light within their visible spectrum requires mixtures of at least four primary colors.

Tetrachromacy is demonstrated among several species of birds, fish, and reptiles. The common ancestor of all vertebrates was a tetrachromat, but a common ancestor of mammals lost two of its four kinds of cone cell, evolving dichromacy, a loss ascribed to the conjectured nocturnal bottleneck. Some primates (including the ancestor of humans) then later re-evolved a third cone.

== Physiology ==
The normal explanation of tetrachromacy is that the organism's retina contains four types of higher-intensity light receptors (called cone cells in vertebrates as opposed to rod cells, which are lower-intensity light receptors) with different spectral sensitivity. This means that the organism may see wavelengths beyond those of a typical human's vision, and may be able to distinguish between colors that, to a non-tetrachromat human, appear to be identical. Species with tetrachromatic color vision may have an unknown physiological advantage over rival species.

== Humans ==
Normalized responsivity spectra of human cone cells, S, M, and L types.

Apes (including humans) and Old World monkeys normally have only three types of cone cell, and are therefore trichromats. However, human tetrachromacy is suspected to exist in a small percentage of the population. Trichromats have three types of cone cells, each type being sensitive to a corresponding portion of the spectrum as shown in the diagram. But at least one woman has been implied to be a tetrachromat. More precisely, she had an additional cone type L′, intermediate between M and L in its responsivity, and showed 3 dimensional (M, L′, and L components) color discrimination for wavelengths 546–670 nm (to which the fourth type, S, is insensitive). She was described as being sensitive to the difference between a red/green mixture and monochromatic orange.

Tetrachromacy requires that there be four independent photoreceptor cell classes with different spectral sensitivity. However, there must also be the appropriate post-receptoral mechanism to compare the signals from the four classes of receptors. According to the opponent process theory, humans have three opponent channels, which give trichromacy. It is unclear whether having available a fourth opponent channel is sufficient for tetrachromacy.

Mice, which normally have only two cone pigments (and therefore two opponent channels), have been engineered to express a third cone pigment, and appear to demonstrate increased chromatic discrimination, possibly indicating trichromacy, and suggesting they were able to create or re-enable a third opponent channel. This would support the theory that humans should be able to utilize a fourth opponent channel for tetrachromatic vision. However, the original publication's claims about plasticity in the optic nerve have also been disputed.

=== Tetrachromacy in carriers of CVD ===
It has been theorized that females who carry recessive opsin alleles that can cause color vision deficiency (CVD, a.k.a. color blindness) could possess tetrachromacy. Female carriers of anomalous trichromacy (mild color blindness) possess heterozygous alleles of the genes that encode the L-opsin or M-opsin. These alleles often have a different spectral sensitivity, so if the carrier expresses both opsin alleles, they may exhibit tetrachromacy.

In humans, two cone cell pigment genes are present on the X chromosome: the classical type 2 opsin genes OPN1MW and OPN1MW2. People with two X chromosomes could possess multiple cone cell pigments, perhaps born as full tetrachromats who have four simultaneously functioning kinds of cone cell, each type with a specific pattern of responsiveness to different wavelengths of light in the range of the visible spectrum. One study suggested that 15% of the world's women might have the type of fourth cone whose sensitivity peak is between the standard red and green cones, theoretically giving a significant increase in color differentiation. Another study suggests that as many as 50% of women and 8% of men may have four photopigments and corresponding potentially increased chromatic discrimination. In 2010, after twenty years' study of women with four types of cones (non-functional tetrachromats), neuroscientist Gabriele Jordan identified a woman (subject 'cDa29') who could detect a greater variety of colors than trichromats could, corresponding with a functional or "true" tetrachromat. Specifically, she has been shown to be a trichromat in the range 546–670 nm where people with normal vision are essentially dichromats due to negligible response of S cones to those wavelengths. Thus, if S cones of 'cDa29' provide independent color perception dimension as they normally do, that would confirm her being a tetrachromat when the whole spectrum is considered.

Variation in cone pigment genes is widespread in most human populations, but the most prevalent and pronounced tetrachromacy would derive from female carriers of major red / green pigment anomalies, usually classed as forms of "color blindness" (protanomaly or deuteranomaly). The biological basis for this phenomenon is X-inactivation of heterozygotic alleles for retinal pigment genes, which is the same mechanism that gives the majority of female New World monkeys trichromatic vision.

In humans, preliminary visual processing occurs in the neurons of the retina. It is not known how these nerves would respond to a new color channel: whether they would handle it separately, or just combine it with one of the existing channels. Similarly, visual information leaves the eye by way of the optic nerve, and a variety of final image processing takes place in the brain; it is not known whether the optic nerve or the areas of the brain have any capacity to effectively respond if presented with a stimulus from a new color signal.

Tetrachromacy may also enhance vision in dim lighting.

=== Conditional tetrachromacy ===
Despite being trichromats, humans can experience slight tetrachromacy at low light intensities, using their mesopic vision. In mesopic vision, both cone cells and rod cells are active. While rods typically do not contribute to color vision, in these specific light conditions, they may give a small region of tetrachromacy in the color space. Human rod cell sensitivity is greatest at 500 nm (bluish-green) wavelength, which is significantly different from the peak spectral sensitivity of the cones (typically 420, 530, and 560 nm).

=== Blocked tetrachromacy ===
Although many birds are tetrachromats with a fourth color in the ultraviolet, humans cannot see ultraviolet light directly because the lens of the eye blocks most light in the wavelength range of 300–400 nm; shorter wavelengths are blocked by the cornea. The photoreceptor cells of the retina are sensitive to near ultraviolet light, and people lacking a lens (a condition known as aphakia) see near ultraviolet light (down to 300 nm) as whitish blue, or for some wavelengths, whitish violet, probably because all three types of cones are roughly equally sensitive to ultraviolet light (with blue cone cells slightly more sensitive).

While an extended visible range does not denote tetrachromacy, some believe that visual pigments are available with sensitivity in near-UV wavelengths that would enable tetrachromacy in the case of aphakia. However, there is no peer-reviewed evidence supporting this claim.

== Other animals ==
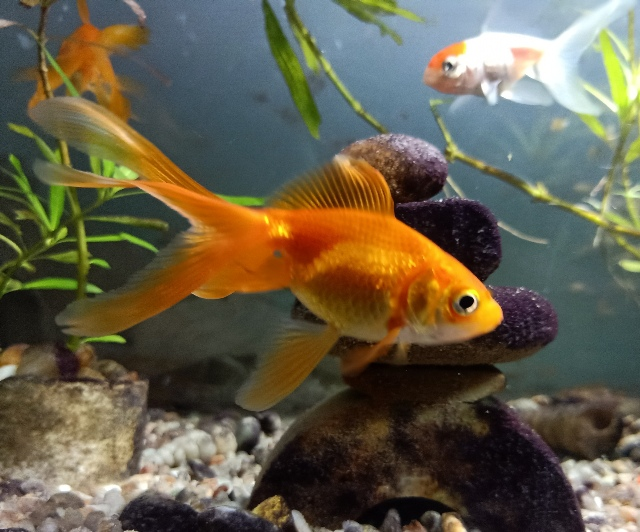
Goldfish have tetrachromacy.

=== Fish ===
Fish, specifically teleosts, are typically tetrachromats. Exceptions include:

- Sharks and rays – range from monochromacy to trichromacy
- Deep-sea fish – often rod monochromats
- Cichlid – arguably pentachromacy or higher

=== Birds ===
Some species of birds, such as the zebra finch and the Columbidae, use the ultraviolet wavelength 300–400 nm specific to tetrachromatic color vision as a tool during mate selection and foraging. When selecting for mates, ultraviolet plumage and skin coloration show a high level of selection. A typical bird eye responds to wavelengths from about 300–700 nm. In terms of frequency, this corresponds to a band in the vicinity of 430–1000 THz. Most birds have retinas with four spectral types of cone cell that are believed to mediate tetrachromatic color vision. Bird color vision is further improved by filtering by pigmented oil droplets in the photoreceptors. The oil droplets filter incident light before it reaches the visual pigment in the outer segments of the photoreceptors.

The four cone types, and the specialization of pigmented oil droplets, give birds better color vision than that of humans. However, more recent research has suggested that tetrachromacy in birds only provides birds with a larger visual spectrum than that in humans (humans cannot see ultraviolet light, 300–400 nm), while the spectral resolution (the "sensitivity" to nuances) is similar.

Some birds such as corvids, Old and New World flycatchers, as well as most diurnal raptors, have little ability to see UV light, with the fourth cone type instead peaking in the violet range. It is believed that UV vision in raptors is selected against because short-wavelength UVA light contributes highly to chromatic aberration, reducing visual acuity which raptorial birds rely on for hunting.

== Pentachromacy and greater ==
The dimensionality of color vision has no upper bound, but vertebrates with color vision greater than tetrachromacy are rare. The next level is pentachromacy, which is five-dimensional color vision requiring at least five different classes of photoreceptor as well as five independent channels of color information through the primary visual system.

A female that is heterozygous for both the LWS and MWS opsins (and therefore a carrier for both protanomaly and deuteranomaly) would express five opsins of different spectral sensitivity. However, for her to be a true (strong) pentachromat, these opsins would need to be segregated into different photoreceptor cells and she would need to have the appropriate post-receptoral mechanisms to handle five opponent process channels, which is contentious.

Some birds (notably pigeons) have five or more kinds of color receptors in their retinae, and are therefore believed to be pentachromats, though psychophysical evidence of functional pentachromacy is lacking. Research also indicates that some lampreys, members of the Petromyzontiformes, may be pentachromats.

Invertebrates can have large numbers of different opsin classes, including 15 opsins in bluebottle butterflies or 33 in mantis shrimp. However, it has not been shown that color vision in these invertebrates is of a dimension commensurate with the number of opsins.

== See also ==
- Dimensionality of color vision
- Monochromacy
- Dichromacy
- Trichromacy
- Evolution of color vision
- Infrared vision
- RG color space
- RGBY
- Somatosensory amplification
- Supertaster
- Olo (color)
