= Principle of univariance =

Concept in the study of perception

Illustration of color metamerism: In column 1, a ball is illuminated by monochromatic light. Multiplying the spectrum by the cones' spectral sensitivity curves gives the response for each cone type. In column 2, metamerism is used to simulate the scene with blue, green and red LEDs, giving a similar response.

The principle of univariance states that a single class of photoreceptors cannot unambiguously determine either the wavelength or intensity of incident light. A single photoreceptor produces a one-dimensional response: it either fires more or less. It will respond identically to changes in either property, and further comparison between photoreceptor types with distinct spectral sensitivities is required to resolve that basic ambiguity. As originally described by W. A. H. Rushton, "The output of a receptor depends upon its quantum catch, but not upon what quanta are caught." The principle of univariance is frequently cited in discussions of color vision because the capacity to discriminate wavelengths from each other requires a comparison between multiple types of photoreceptors. The principle of univariance also makes the comparison between multiple classes of photoreceptors a necessary, but not sufficient, condition to separately encode either intensity as brightness or wavelength as color.

The principle of univariance can be seen in situations where a stimulus can vary in two dimensions, but a cell's response can vary in one. For example, a colored light may vary in both wavelength and in luminance. However, the brain's cells can only vary in the rate at which action potentials are fired. Therefore, a cell tuned to red light may respond the same to a dim red light as to a bright yellow light. To avoid this, the response of multiple cells is compared.

== Color vision deficiencies ==
=== Human dichromacy ===
Those with red-green color blindness (either protanopia or deuteranopia) still possess two distinct classes of photoreceptors with different spectral sensitivities. Both groups will possess fully functioning S-cones, deuteranopia leaves the L- cones unaffected, and protanopia leaves the M- cones unaffected. In such cases, one cone is missing, but the blue-yellow chromatic ganglion cells still compare the signals of the S-cones to whichever cone remains. While deuteranopia and protanopia both limit color discrimination, the basic ambiguity produced by the principle of univariance is still resolved, and individuals with such conditions can functionally discriminate many (though not all) wavelengths, and encode intensity and wavelength as distinct properties of light.

=== Blue-cone monochromacy ===
In blue-chrome monochromacy, individuals lack both L-cones and M-cones. Only S-cones remain and rods. In this case, the principle of univariance causes significant problems. Without the capacity to compare the outputs of two different classes of photoreceptors, wavelength and intensity remain conflated, resulting in a variety of functional deficits. However, in mesopic conditions, where light levels are high enough to be detected by cones and low enough to be detected by rods, there is limited evidence that signals between those two classes of photoreceptors are compared, resulting in limited colour discrimination. This is sometimes called conditional dichromacy.

=== Rod monochromacy ===
In rod monochromacy, an individual possesses only rod photoreceptors, and no cone photoreceptors. This means that even conditional dichromacy is impossible, and all photoreceptor signals necessarily conflate intensity and wavelength.
