= Nocturnal bottleneck =

Hypothesis to explain traits in mammals

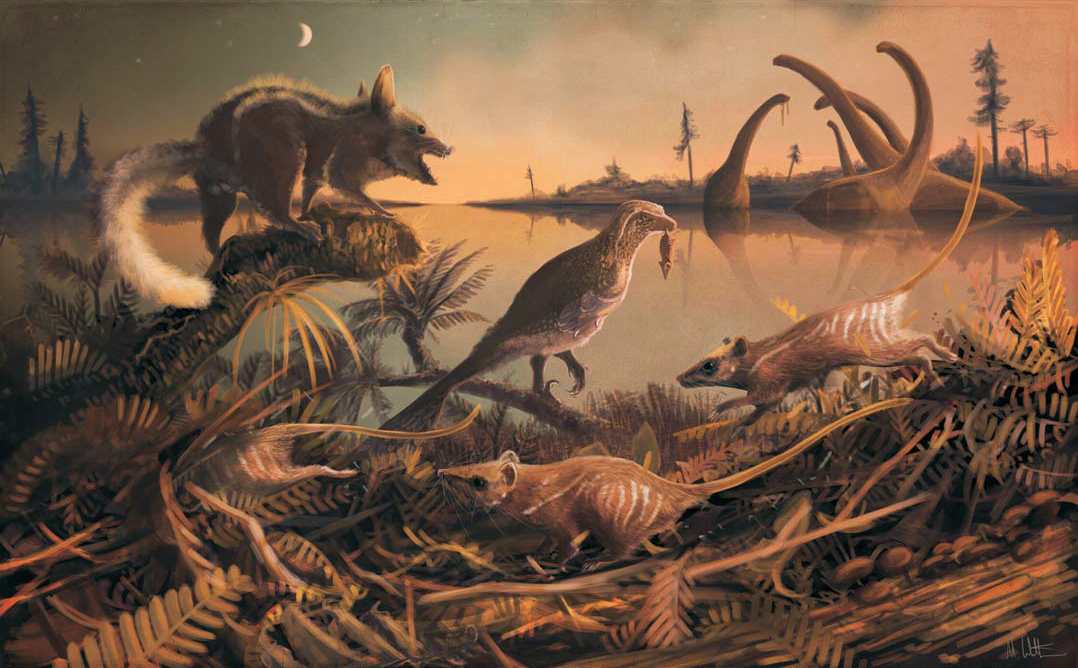
Artist's impression of the Purbeck lagoon at dusk: Durlstotherium (right and center foreground) and Durlstodon (left foreground) ventured out at night to hunt insects. The theropod Nuthetes is holding a captured Durlstotherium (centre middle distance).

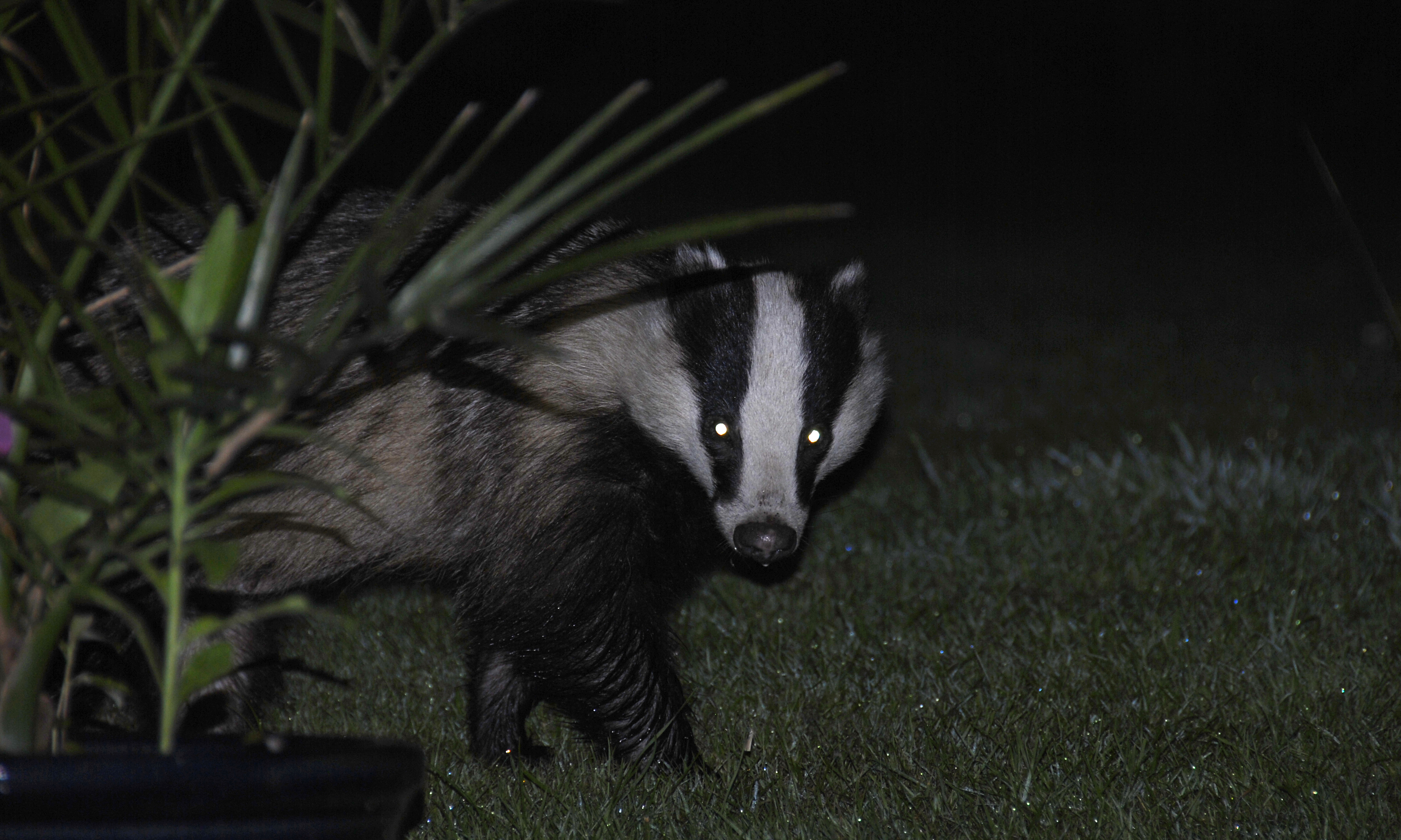
The flash of a camera causes glare reflected by the tapetum lucidum within the eyes of a European badger. The tapetum is one of many traits adapted for nocturnal life that are commonly found in mammals.

The nocturnal bottleneck hypothesis is an evolutionary biology hypothesis to explain the origin of several mammalian traits. In 1942, Gordon Lynn Walls described this concept which states that placental mammals were mainly or even exclusively nocturnal through most of their evolutionary history, from their origin 225 million years ago during the Late Triassic to after the Cretaceous–Paleogene extinction event, 66 million years ago. While some mammalian groups later adapted to diurnal (daytime) lifestyles to fill niches newly vacated by the extinction of non-avian dinosaurs, the approximately 160 million years spent as nocturnal animals has left a lasting legacy on basal mammalian anatomy and physiology, and most mammals are still nocturnal.

== Evolution of mammals ==
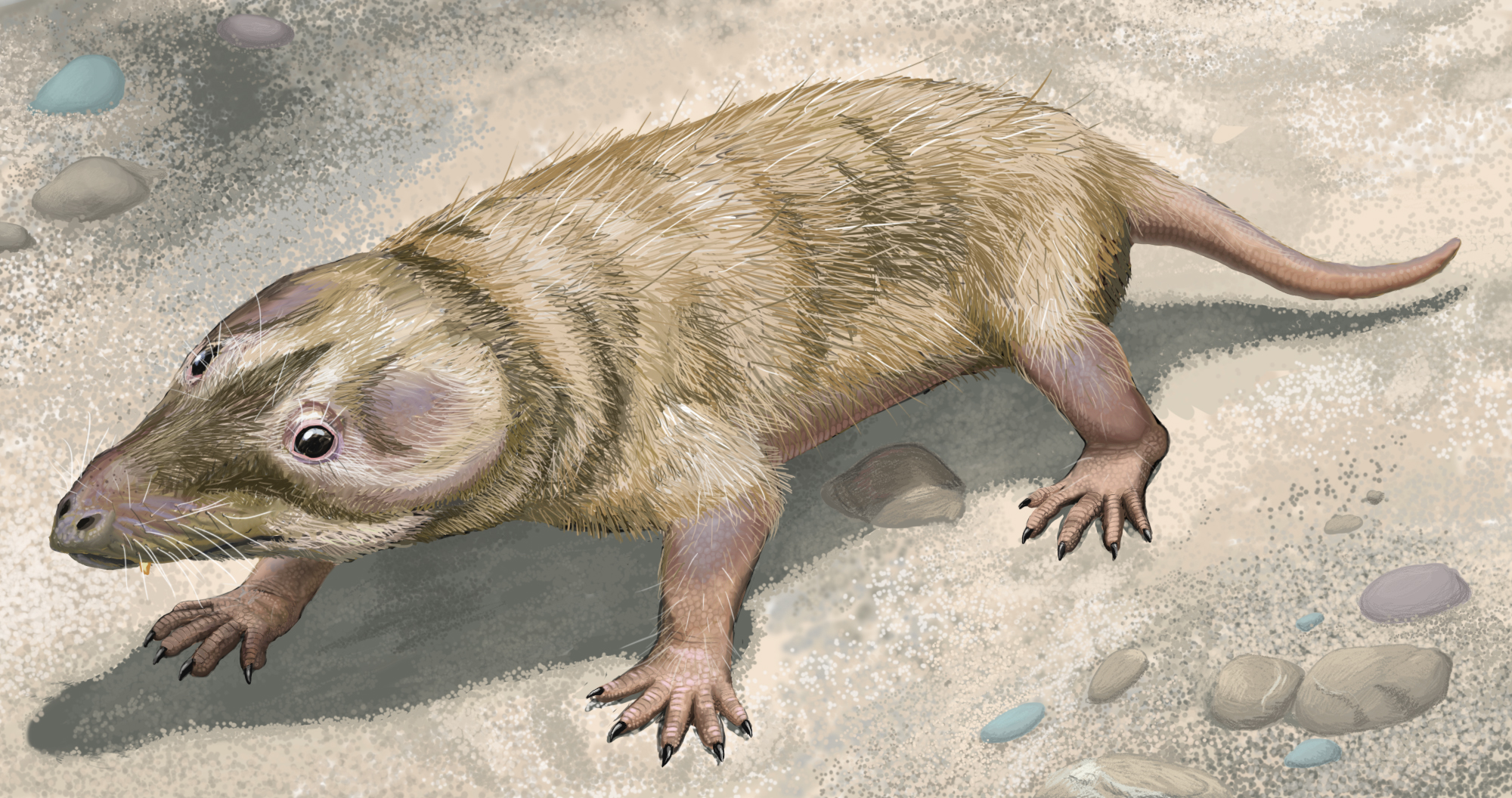
Brasilitherium, a near-mammalian cynodont, was probably a nocturnal burrower.

Mammals evolved from cynodonts, a group of superficially dog-like therapsid synapsids that survived the Permian–Triassic mass extinction. The emerging archosaurian sauropsids, including pseudosuchians, pterosaurs and dinosaurs and their ancestors, flourished after the Early Triassic Smithian–Spathian boundary event and competitively displaced the larger therapsids into extinction, leaving only the smaller burrowing cynodonts. The surviving cynodonts could only succeed in leftover niches with minimal competitions from the more dominant, diurnal dinosaurs, evolving into the nocturnal, small-bodied, insectivorous and granivorous dwellers of the forest undergrowths. While the early mammals continued to develop into several probably quite common groups of animals during the Mesozoic, they all remained relatively small and nocturnal.

Mammals experienced a significant radiation from the angiosperm revolution during the Middle/Late Cretaceous, but only with the massive end-Cretaceous extinction event did the dinosaurs' demise leave the stage open for the establishment of new mammalian faunae. Despite this, mammals continued to be small-bodied for millions of years. While all the largest animals alive today are mammals, the majority of mammals are still small nocturnal animals.

== Mammalian nocturnal adaptations ==
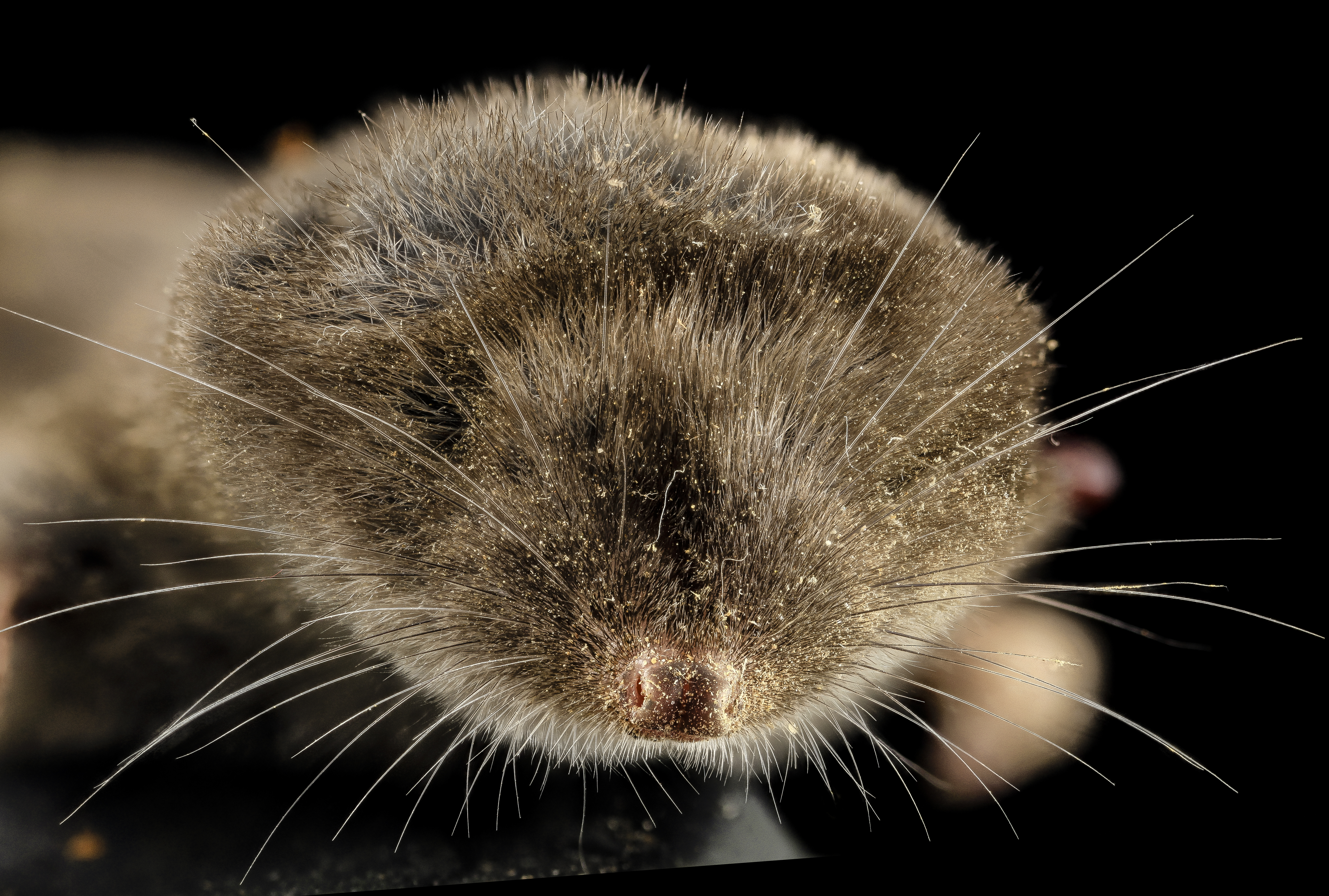
The whiskers on a shrew, used in finding prey, navigation and socialization

Numerous features of mammalian physiology, especially features relating to the sensory organs, appear to be adaptations to a nocturnal lifestyle. These include:

=== Senses ===
- An acute sense of hearing, with coiled cochleae, sound-collecting auricles on the outer ear and sound-amplifying ossicles in the middle ear.
- Very good sense of smell, well developed nasal turbinates. Most mammals have a large olfactory bulb.
- Well-developed sense of touch, particularly the whiskers.
- With the exception of higher primates, very large cornea, giving less visual acuity compared to birds and reptiles.
- Limited colour vision.

=== Physiology ===
- Endothermia that enabled early mammals to become independent of solar radiation and environmental factors.
- Unique type of brown adipose tissue, allowing mammals to generate heat quickly.
- Mitochondria with respiration rates five to seven times higher than those of reptiles of similar size.
- Fur to assist in thermo-regulation in a cold (night) environment.
- Lack of an ocular shielding mechanism against (diurnal) ultraviolet light.
- Loss of the ability to produce gadusol, a chemical which protects against the sun.
- The photolyase DNA repair mechanism, which relies on visible light, does not work in the placental mammals, despite being present and functional in bacteria, fungi, and most other animals.

=== Behaviour ===
- Circadian rhythm and behaviour patterns in all basal mammalian groups are nocturnal, at least in placentals.
- Burrowing lifestyle allowing sheltering from climate and diurnal predators appears to be a basal mammalian trait.
