= Photon counting =

Counting photons using a single-photon detector

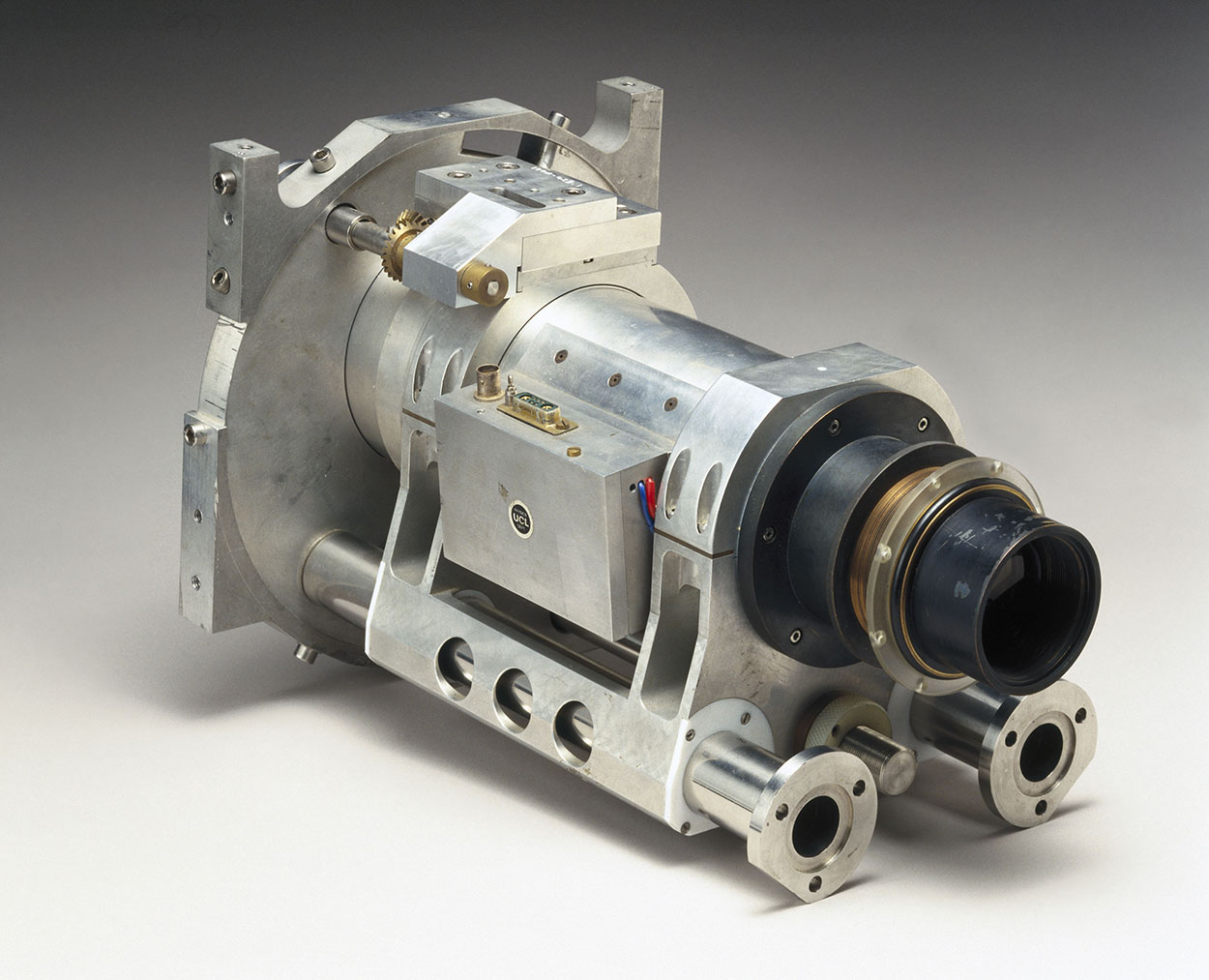
A prototype single-photon detector that was used on the 200-inch Hale Telescope. The Hubble Space Telescope has a similar detector.

Photon counting is a technique in which individual photons are counted using a single-photon detector (SPD). A single-photon detector emits a pulse of signal for each detected photon. The counting efficiency is determined by the quantum efficiency and the system's electronic losses.

Many photodetectors can be configured to detect individual photons, each with relative advantages and disadvantages. Common types include photomultipliers, geiger counters, single-photon avalanche diodes, superconducting nanowire single-photon detectors, transition edge sensors, and scintillation counters. Charge-coupled devices can be used.

== Advantages ==
Photon counting eliminates gain noise, where the proportionality constant between analog signal out and number of photons varies randomly. Thus, the excess noise factor of a photon-counting detector is unity, and the achievable signal-to-noise ratio for a fixed number of photons is generally higher than the same detector without photon counting.

Photon counting can improve temporal resolution. In a conventional detector, multiple arriving photons generate overlapping impulse responses, limiting temporal resolution to approximately the fall time of the detector. However, if it is known that a single photon was detected, the center of the impulse response can be evaluated to precisely determine its arrival time. Using time-correlated single-photon counting (TCSPC), temporal resolution of less than 25 ps has been demonstrated using detectors with a fall time more than 20 times greater.

== Disadvantages ==
Single-photon detectors are typically limited to detecting one photon at a time and may require time between detection events to reset. Photons that arrive during this interval may not be detected. Therefore, the maximum light intensity that can be accurately measured is typically low. Measurements composed of small numbers of photons intrinsically have a low signal-to-noise ratio caused by the randomly varying numbers of emitted photons. This effect is less pronounced in conventional detectors that can concurrently detect large numbers of photons. Because of the lower maximum signal level, either the signal-to-noise ratio will be lower or the exposure time longer than for conventional detection.

== Applications ==
Single-photon detection is useful in fields such as:

- Fiber-optic communication
- Quantum information science
- Quantum encryption
- Medical imaging
- Light detection and ranging
- DNA sequencing
- Astrophysics
- Materials science

=== Medicine ===
In radiology, one of the major disadvantages of X-ray imaging modalities is the negative effects of ionising radiation. Although the risk from small exposures (as used in most medical imaging) is thought to be small, the radiation protection principle of "as low as reasonably practicable" (ALARP) is always applied. One way of reducing exposures is to make X-ray detectors as efficient as possible, so that lower doses can be used for a given diagnostic image quality. Photon counting detectors could help, due to their ability to reject noise more easily. Photon counting is analogous to color photography, where each photon's differing energy affects the output, as compared to charge integration, which considers only the intensity of the signal, as in black and white photography.

Photon-counting mammography was introduced commercially in 2003. Although such systems are not widespread, some evidence supports their ability to produce comparable images at an approximately 40% lower dose than other digital mammography systems with flat panel detectors. Spectral imaging technology was subsequently developed to discriminate between photon energies, with the possibility to further improve image quality and to distinguish tissue types. Photon-counting computed tomography is another interest area, which is rapidly evolving and is approaching clinical feasibility.

=== Fluorescence-lifetime imaging microscopy ===
Time-correlated single-photon counting (TCSPC) precisely records the arrival times of individual photons, enabling measurement of picosecond time-scale differences in the arrival times of photons generated by fluorescent, phosphorescence or other chemical processes that emit light, providing additional molecular information about samples. The use of TCSPC enables relatively slow detectors to measure extremely minute time differences that would be obscured by overlapping impulse responses if multiple photons were incident concurrently.

=== LIDAR ===
Some pulse LIDAR systems operate in single photon counting mode using TCSPC to achieve higher resolution. Infrared photon-counting technologies for LIDAR are advancing rapidly.

== Measured quantities ==
The number of photons observed per unit time is the photon flux. The photon flux per unit area is the photon irradiance if the photons are incident on a surface, or photon exitance if the emission of photons from a broad-area source is being considered. The flux per unit solid angle is the photon intensity. The flux per unit source area per unit solid angle is photon radiance. SI units for these quantities are summarized in the table below.

SI photon units
Quantity		Unit		Dimension	Notes
Name	Symbol (Note: Standards organizations recommend that photon quantities be denoted with a suffix "q" (for "quantum") to avoid confusion with radiometric and photometric quantities.)	Name	Symbol	Dimension	Notes
photon energy	n			1	count of photons n with energy Q_{p} = hc/λ. (Note: The energy of a single photon at wavelength λ is Q_{p} = hc/λ with h = Planck constant and c = velocity of light.)
photon flux	Φ_{q}	count per second	s^{−1}	T^{−1}	photons per unit time, dn/dt with n = photon number. also called photon power
photon intensity	I	count per steradian per second	sr^{−1}⋅s^{−1}	T^{−1}	dn/dω
photon radiance	L_{q}	count per square metre per steradian per second	m^{−2}⋅sr^{−1}⋅s^{−1}	L^{−2}T^{−1}	d^{2}n/(dA cos(θ) dω)
photon irradiance	E_{q}	count per square metre per second	m^{−2}⋅s^{−1}	L^{−2}T^{−1}	dn/dA
photon exitance	M	count per square metre per second	m^{−2}⋅s^{−1}	L^{−2}T^{−1}	dn/dA
See also: Photon counting; SI; Radiometry; Photometry

== See also ==
- Oversampled binary image sensor
- Single-photon source
- Superconducting nanowire single-photon detector
- Time-correlated single photon counting
- Transition edge sensor
- Visible Light Photon Counter
