= X-ray machine =

Machine that generates X-rays

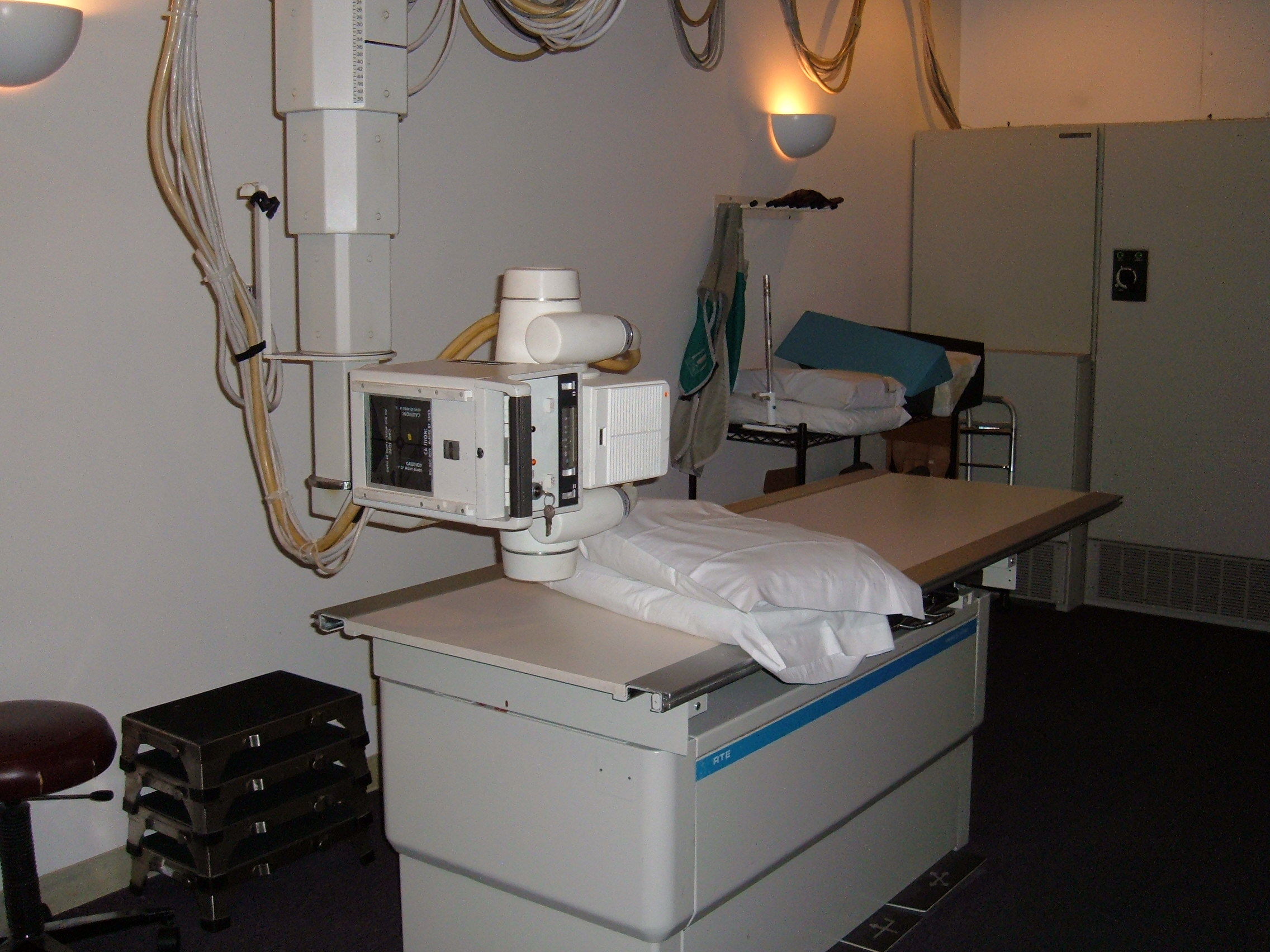
A radiology room table. The X-ray housing is turned by 90° for a chest radiograph

An X-ray machine is a device that uses X-rays for a variety of applications including medicine, X-ray fluorescence, electronic assembly inspection, and measurement of material thickness in manufacturing operations. In medical applications, X-ray machines are used by radiographers to acquire x-ray images of the internal structures (e.g., bones) of living organisms, and also in sterilization.

== Structure ==
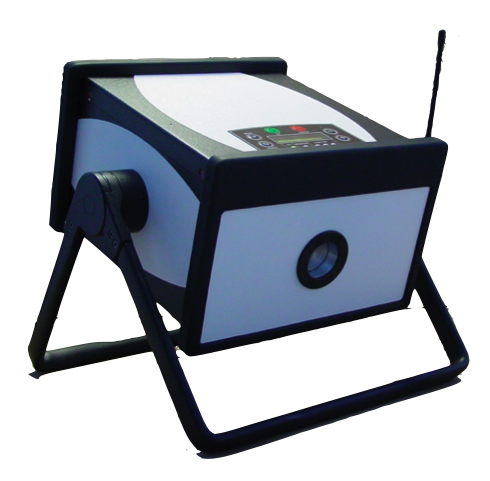
GemX-160 - portable wireless controlled battery-powered X-ray generator for use in non-destructive testing and security.

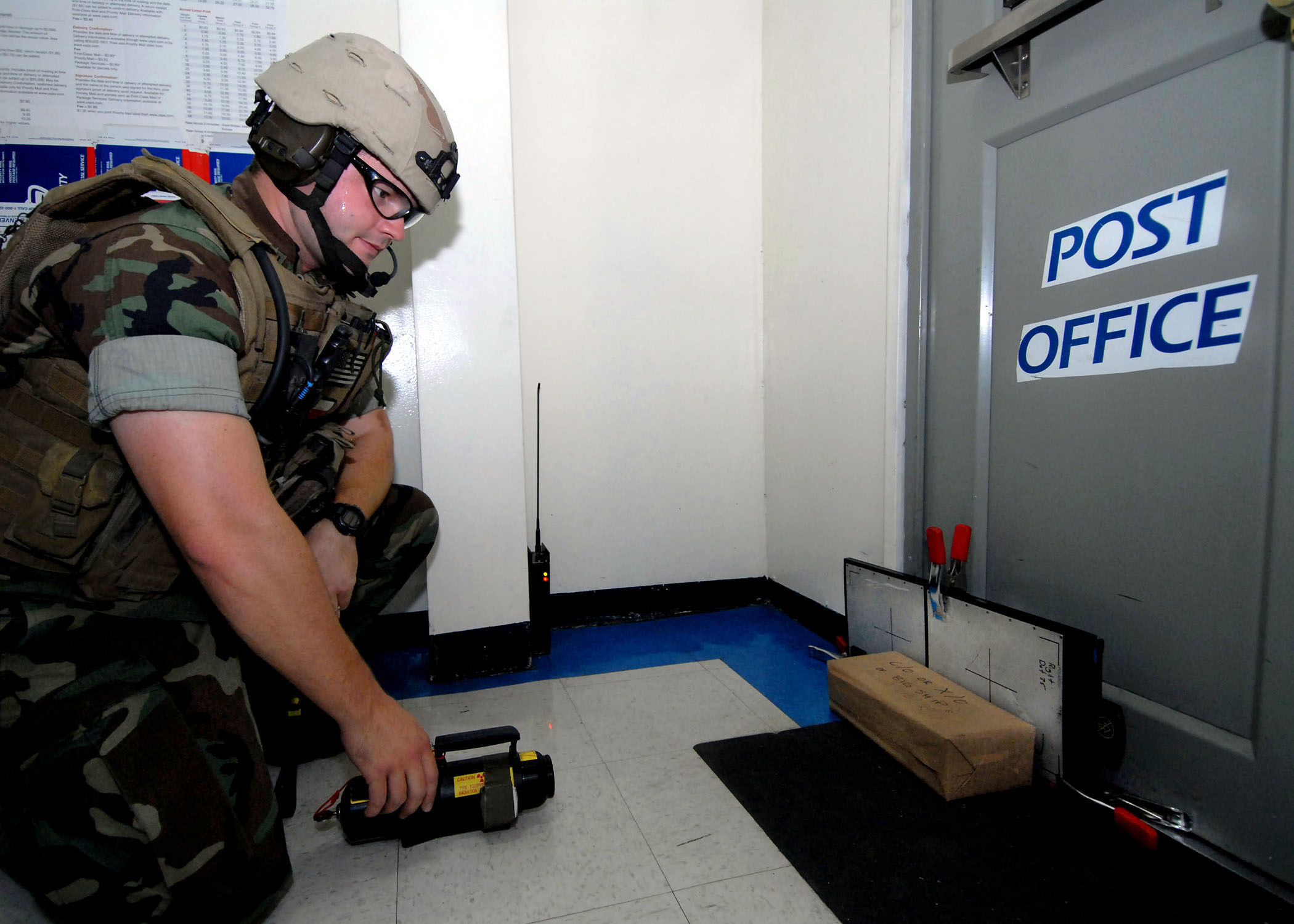
XR150 - portable pulsed X-ray battery powered X-ray generator used in security.

An X-ray generator generally contains an X-ray tube to produce the X-rays. Possibly, radioisotopes can also be used to generate X-rays.

An X-ray tube is a simple vacuum tube that contains a cathode, which directs a stream of electrons into a vacuum, and an anode, which collects the electrons and is made of tungsten to evacuate the heat generated by the collision. When the electrons collide with the target, about 1% of the resulting energy is emitted as X-rays, with the remaining 99% released as heat. Due to the high energy of the electrons that reach relativistic speeds, the target is usually made of tungsten even if other material can be used particularly in XRF applications.

An X-ray generator also needs to contain a cooling system to cool the anode; many X-ray generators use water or oil recirculating systems.

=== Medical imaging ===
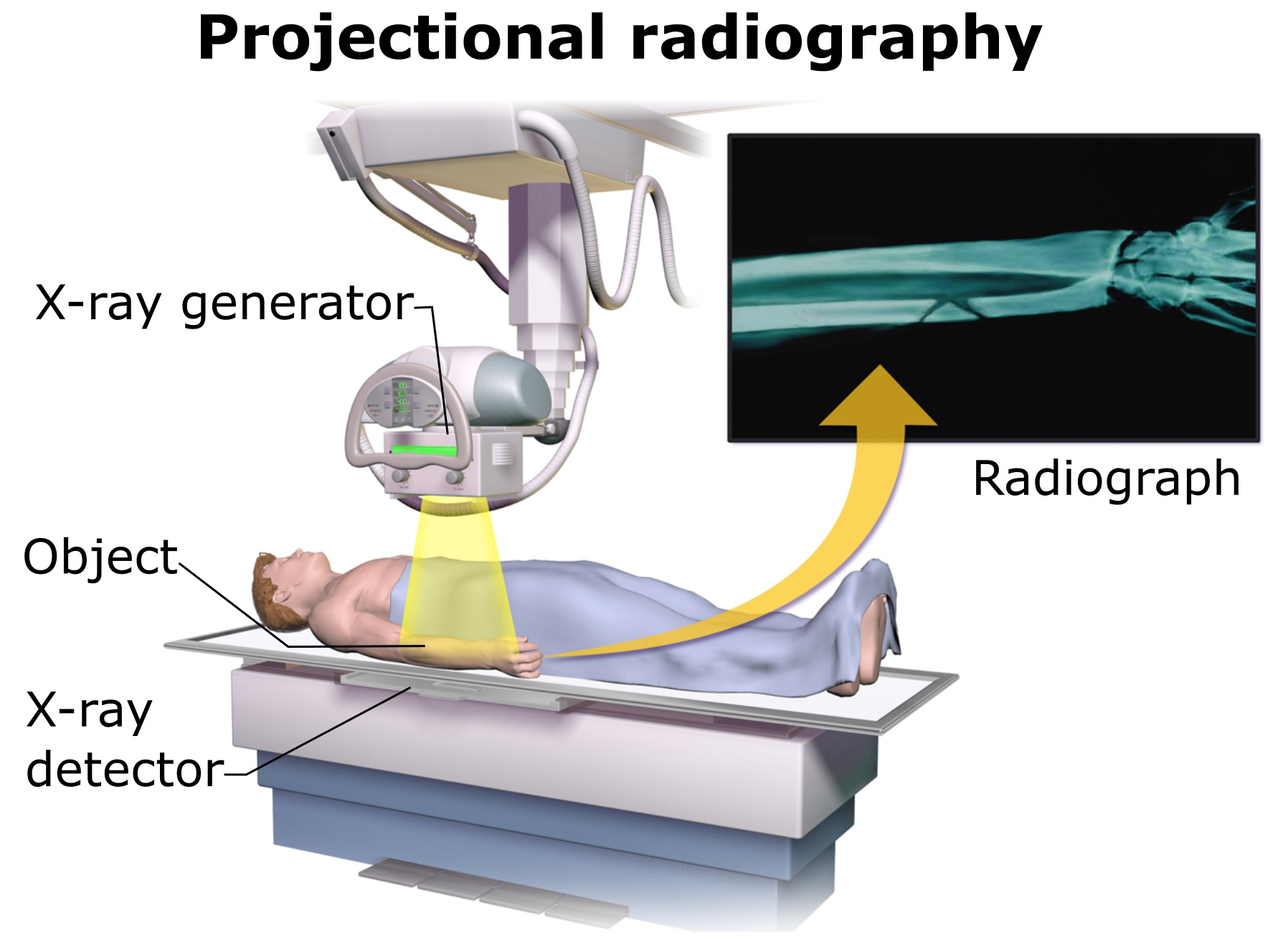
Acquisition of projectional radiography, with an X-ray generator and a detector.

In medical imaging applications, an X-ray machine has a control console that is used by a radiologic technologist to select X-ray techniques suitable for the specific exam, a power supply that creates and produces the desired kVp (peak kilovoltage), mA (milliamperes, sometimes referred to as mAs which is actually mA multiplied by the desired exposure length) for the X-ray tube, and the X-ray tube itself.

== History ==
The discovery of X-rays came from experimenting with Crookes tubes, an early experimental electrical discharge tube invented by English physicist William Crookes around 1869–1875. In 1895, Wilhelm Röntgen discovered X-rays emanating from Crookes tubes and the many uses for X-rays were immediately apparent. One of the first X-ray photographs was made of the hand of Röntgen's wife. The image displayed both her wedding ring and bones. On January 18, 1896, an X-ray machine was formally displayed by Henry Louis Smith. A fully functioning unit was introduced to the public at the 1904 World's Fair by Clarence Dally. The technology developed quickly: In 1909 Mónico Sánchez Moreno had produced the first portable medical device and during World War I, Marie Curie led the development of X-ray machines mounted in "radiological cars" to provide mobile X-ray services for military field hospitals.

In the 1940s and 1950s, X-ray machines were used in stores to help sell footwear. These were known as Shoe-fitting fluoroscopes. However, as the harmful effects of X-ray radiation were properly considered, they finally fell out of use. Shoe-fitting use of the device was first banned by the state of Pennsylvania in 1957. (They were more a clever marketing tool to attract customers, rather than a fitting aid.) Together with Robert J. Van de Graaff, John G. Trump developed one of the first million-volt X-ray generators.

By the late 1990s, the manufacturing industry for X-ray machines based on conventional film technology was becoming commoditized.

The technology took another leap in the 2000s, as physicists at CERN developed a new way to observe particles - thy hybrid pixel detector. This method is more precise than film radiography, as it converts the energy of each particle into data. The first chip was developed in the 1990s, and in 2010s the technology was made available commercially. It is used in a wide variety of machines, most notably Photon-counting computed tomography.

== Description ==
An X-ray imaging system consists of a generator control console where the operator selects desired techniques to obtain a quality readable image (kVp, mA and exposure time), an x-ray generator which controls the x-ray tube current, x-ray tube kilovoltage and x-ray emitting exposure time, an X-ray tube that converts the kilovoltage and mA into actual x-rays and an image detection system which can be either a film (analog technology) or a digital capture system and a PACS.

== Applications ==
X-ray machines are used in health care for visualising bone structures, during surgeries (especially orthopedic) to assist surgeons in reattaching broken bones with screws or structural plates, assisting cardiologists in locating blocked arteries and guiding stent placements or performing angioplasties and for other dense tissues such as tumours. Non-medicinal applications include security and material analysis.

=== Medicine ===
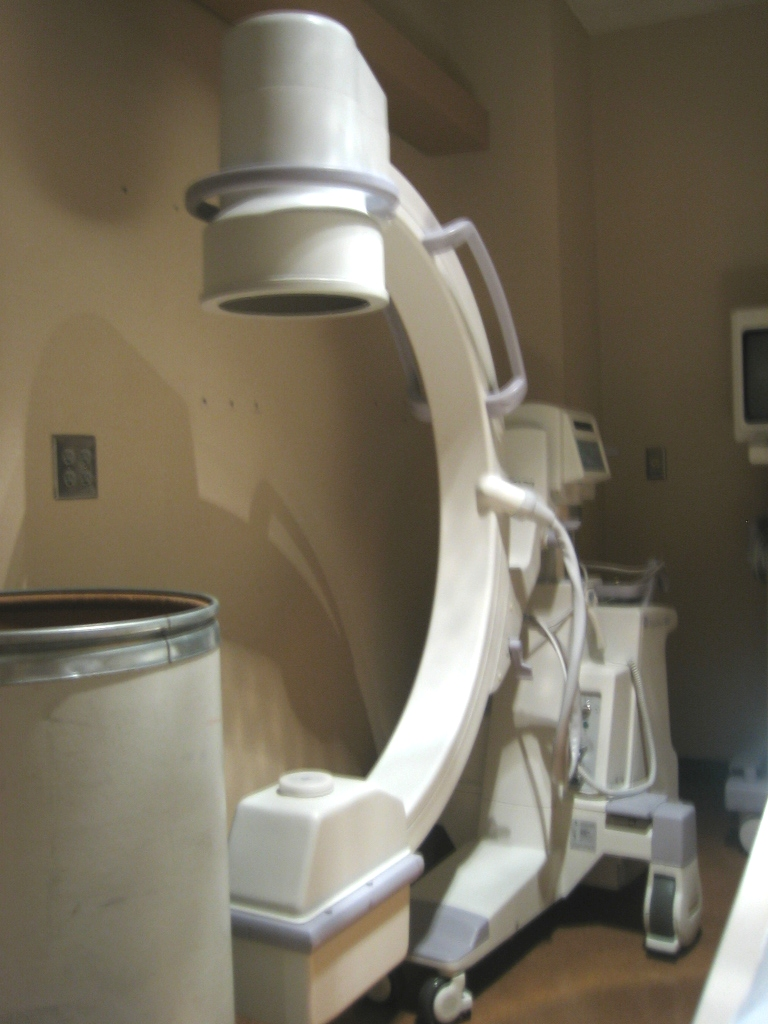
Mobile fluoroscopy units can produce images continuously.

The main fields in which x-ray machines are used in medicine are radiography, radiotherapy, and fluoroscopic-type procedures.

==== Radiography ====
Radiography is generally used for fast, highly penetrating images, and is usually used in areas with a high bone content but can also be used to look for tumors such as with mammography imaging. Some forms of radiography include:

- orthopantomogram — a panoramic x-ray of the jaw showing all the teeth at once
- mammography — x-rays of breast tissue
- tomography — x-ray imaging in sections

X-rays are highly penetrating, ionizing radiation, therefore X-ray machines are used to take pictures of dense tissues such as bones and teeth. This is because bones absorb the radiation more than the less dense soft tissue. X-rays from a source pass through the body and onto a photographic cassette. Areas where radiation is absorbed show up as lighter shades of grey (closer to white). This can be used to diagnose broken or fractured bones.

==== Radiotherapy ====
Radiotherapy is the use of x-ray radiation to treat malignant and benign cancer cells. It is a non-imaging application.

==== Fluoroscopy ====
Fluoroscopy is used in cases where real-time visualization is necessary (and is most commonly encountered in everyday life at airport security). Some medical applications of fluoroscopy include:

- angiography — used to examine blood vessels in real time along with the placement of stents and other procedures to repair blocked arteries.
- barium enema — a procedure used to examine problems of the colon and lower gastrointestinal tract
- barium swallow — similar to a barium enema, but used to examine the upper gastrointestinal tract
- biopsy — the removal of tissue for examination
- pain management — used to visually see and guide needles for administering/injecting pain medications, steroids or pain blocking medications throughout the spinal region.
- orthopedic procedures — used to guide placement and removal of bone structure reinforcement plates, rods and fastening hardware used to aide the healing process and alignment of bone structures healing properly together
- imaging of the digestive tract is done with the help of a radiocontrast agent such as barium sulfate, which is opaque to X-rays

=== Security ===
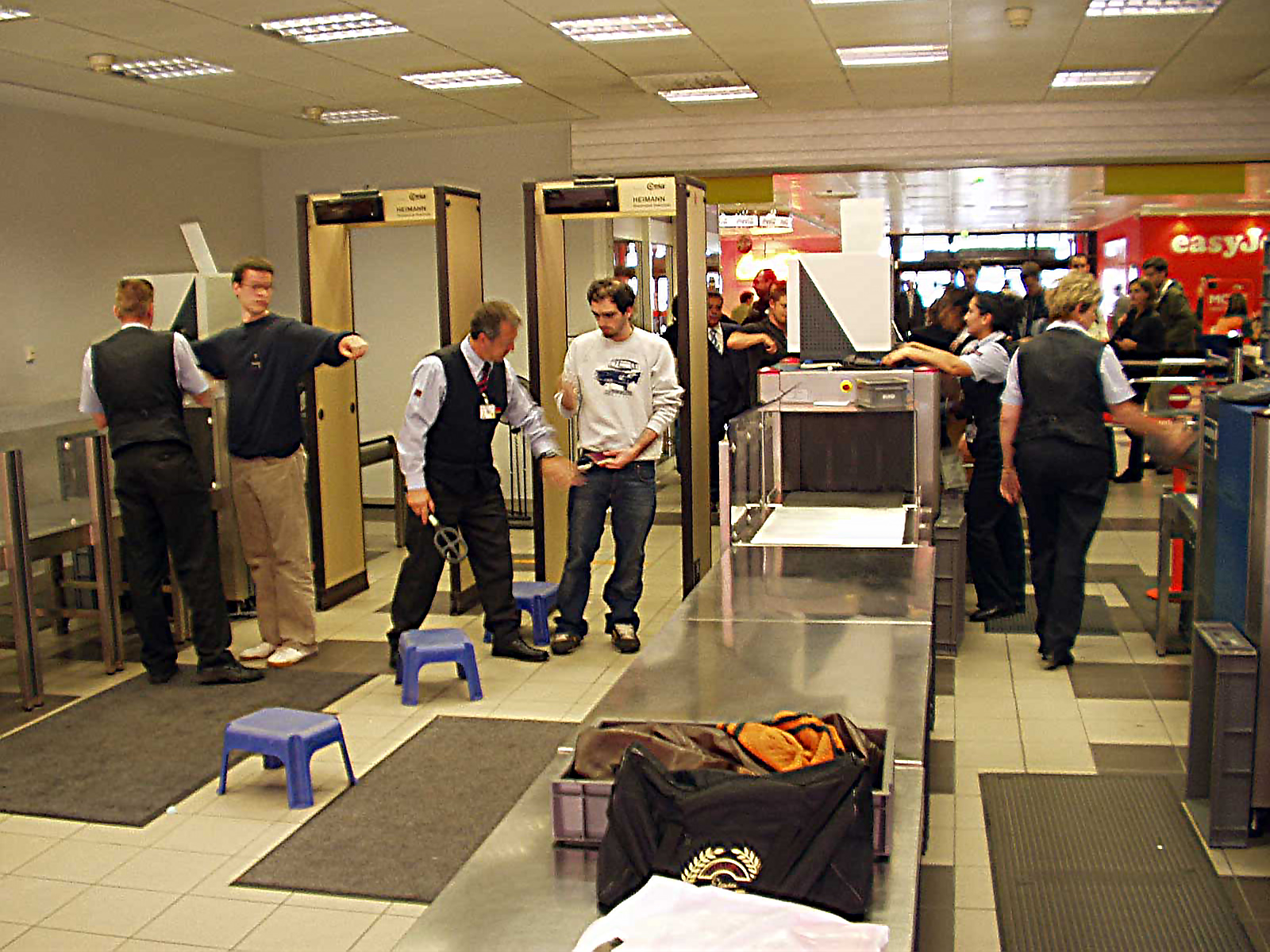
Hand-luggage inspection machine at Berlin Schönefeld Airport.

X-ray machines are used to screen objects non-invasively. Luggage at airports and student baggage at some schools are examined for possible weapons, including bombs. Prices of these luggage x-rays vary from $50,000 to $300,000. The main parts of an X-ray baggage inspection system are the generator used to generate x-rays, the detector to detect radiation after passing through the baggage, signal processor unit (usually a PC) to process the incoming signal from the detector, and a conveyor system for moving baggage into the system. Portable pulsed x-ray battery powered X-ray generator used in security as shown in the figure provides EOD responders safer analysis of any possible target hazard.

==== Operation ====
When baggage is placed on the conveyor, it is moved into the machine by the operator. There is an infrared transmitter and receiver assembly to detect the baggage when it enters the tunnel. This assembly gives the signal to switch on the generator and signal processing system. The signal processing system processes incoming signals from the detector and reproduce an image based upon the type of material and material density inside the baggage. This image is then sent to the display unit.

==== Color classification ====
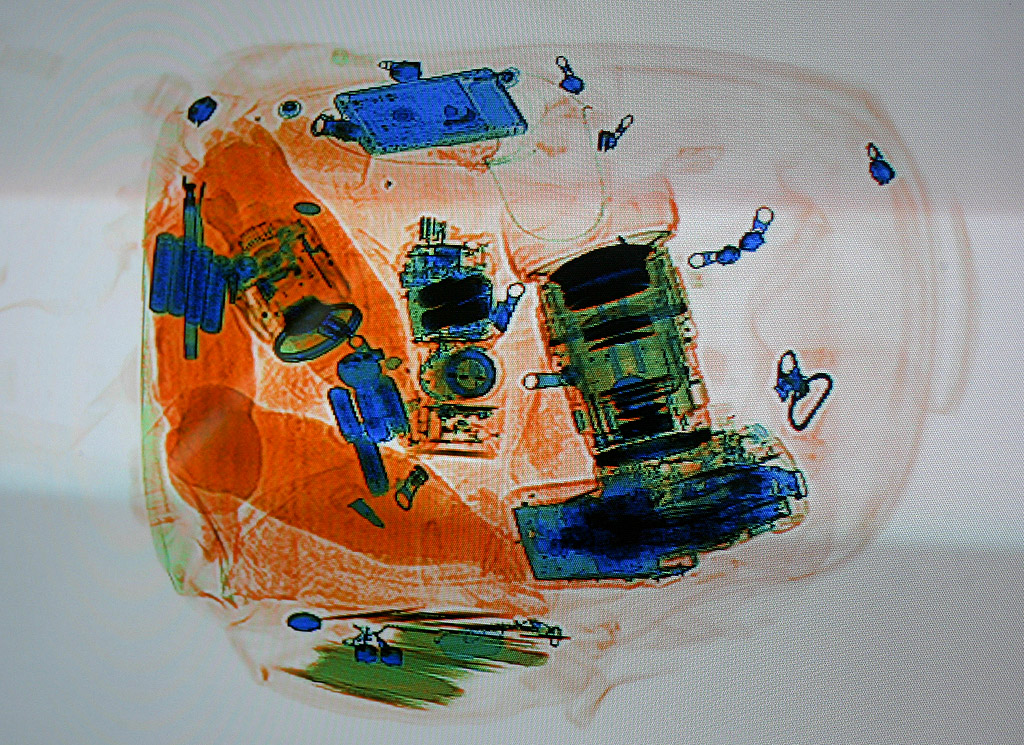
X-ray image of a backpack. Organic and inorganic materials are discriminated in using dual energy techniques.

The colour of the image displayed depends upon the material type and material density. The x-ray analysis is based upon the periodic table. Elements from 1 to 10, such as hydrogen, carbon, nitrogen and oxygen, classed as organic material, will be coloured in shades of orange. These materials include paper, clothes, most food stuffs and the majority of explosives.

Elements from 19 to 56, such as titanium, iron, copper, zirconium, silver and tin, classed as inorganic materials, appear in shades of blue.

The colour green is used for what may be called the mixed group. The mixed group includes elements 11 to 18, such as sodium, aluminium and chlorine. It also includes materials that are a mixture of elements that are normally displayed as either orange and green or orange and blue.

An example is the material PVC. PVC is a combination of carbon (orange), hydrogen (orange) and chloride (green). Another is certain types of fertiliser, such as ammonium nitrate containing potassium. Ammonium nitrate is a combination of hydrogen, nitrogen and oxygen (all orange) and potassium (blue). When these materials are presented by the x-ray machine, based on their mixtures they may be displayed as mixed materials in green.

A third reason for the use of the colour green is where one material, say copper, overlays another material, say wood. The copper would normally be blue and wood orange, however where they cross (overlay) the machine sees this as a mixture, and will use the colour green.

Elements from 57 and above, such as platinum, mercury, gold and lead will be displayed using the colour black. This colour will also be used where there is sufficient density to prevent the x-ray machine from effectively analysing the materials.

Some machines may display density using a yellowish green or red.

The darkness of the colors depend upon the density or thickness of the materials. The thicker or denser the material, the darker the shade used.

The material density determination is achieved by two-layer detector. The layers of the detector pixels are separated with a strip of metal. The metal absorbs soft rays, letting the shorter, more penetrating wavelengths through to the bottom layer of detectors, turning the detector to a crude two-band spectrometer.

== Safety ==
In 2012, European Commission of Radiation Protection set leakage radiation limit from X-ray generators such as X-ray tubes and CT machines as one mGy/hour at one metre distance from the machine.

== Advances in X-ray technology ==
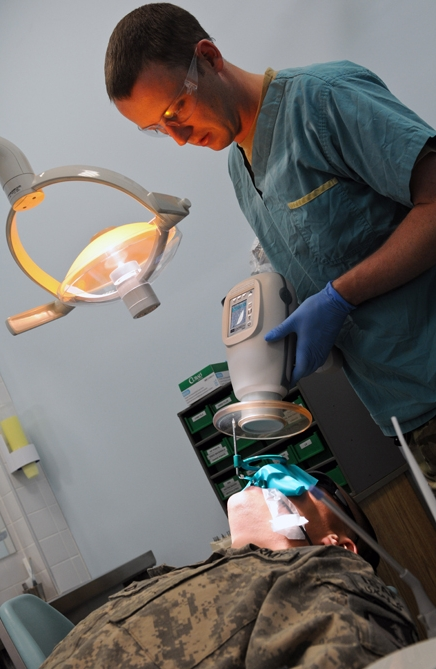
5.5-pound (2.5 kg) dental digital X-ray system under testing in 2011

A film of carbon nanotubes (as a cathode) that emits electrons at room temperature when exposed to an electrical field has been fashioned into an X-ray device. An array of these emitters can be placed around a target item to be scanned and the images from each emitter can be assembled by computer software to provide a 3-dimensional image of the target in a fraction of the time it takes using a conventional X-ray device. The system also allows rapid, precise control, enabling prospective physiological gated imaging.

Australian x-ray manufacturer Micro-X was the first to commercialise carbon nanotube x-ray in the medical sector. In collaboration with researchers at Flinders University and the University of Adelaide, the company invented and patented a new and stable way of creating high current x-ray emission using carbon nanotubes. They are now developing a miniaturised CT for stroke diagnosis in partnership with the Australian Stroke Alliance

Engineers at the University of Missouri (MU), Columbia, have invented a compact source of x-rays and other forms of radiation. The radiation source is the size of a stick of gum and could be used to create portable x-ray scanners. A prototype handheld x-ray scanner using the source could be manufactured in as soon as three years.

== See also ==
- Fluoroscope
- Backscatter X-ray e.g., for security scanning passengers (rather than baggage)
- X-ray crystallography
- Radiography
- X-ray fluorescence
- X-ray astronomy (detectors)
