= Photon-counting mammography =

Breast imaging technique

Photon-counting mammography was introduced commercially in 2003 and was the first widely available application of photon-counting detector technology in medical x-ray imaging. Photon-counting mammography improves dose efficiency compared to conventional technologies, and enables spectral imaging.

== Background ==
Conventional detectors for x-ray imaging are energy integrating, i.e., all photon interactions over a certain time interval are integrated. Photon-counting detectors, on the other hand, are fast enough to register single photon events. Photon-counting detectors have been used in nuclear medicine for decades, but their introduction to transmission imaging was relatively late, mainly as a result of the higher flux that leads to an unwanted condition called pulse pileup, which is one of the main challenges for photon-counting detectors. Partly for this reason, the first, and to date (2020) only, widely available photon-counting x-ray imaging modality is a mammography system; mammography requires high spatial resolution, which results in small detector elements and therefore relatively low count rates. The MicroDose mammography system was introduced by Sectra Mamea in 2003 and acquired by Philips in 2011.

The MicroDose system is based on an array of silicon strip detectors in a multi-slit configuration that is scanned across the object to acquire an image. When a photon interacts in the detector, charge is released and collected by electrodes on the sensor. The electrodes are connected to parallel channels in an application-specific integrated circuit (ASIC). Each channel comprises an amplifier and a shaper, which convert the charge to a pulse with an amplitude proportional to the energy of the impinging photon. This pulse height is measured by comparators, generally referred to as energy thresholds, which are followed by corresponding counters. The counters register the sum of all events within a specific energy window and are generally referred to as energy bins. The lower-most threshold is put below the expected incident spectrum to prevent electronic noise from being counted. The energy resolution of the MicroDose detector ranges from 2.0–2.3 keV standard deviation in the range 20–40 keV.

The advantages of silicon as a detector material include high charge-collection efficiency, ready availability of high-quality high-purity material, and established methods for test and assembly driven by the semiconductor industry. The main challenge is the relatively low detection efficiency of silicon, which in the MicroDose system is addressed by arranging the silicon wafers edge on. Several research groups and commercial companies are investigating cadmium–zinc telluride (CZT) as sensor material. The higher atomic number of CZT results in higher absorption than silicon, but the higher K-fluorescent yield degrades the spectral response and leads to cross-talk. Also, manufacturing of macro-sized crystals of these materials poses practical challenges, and the crystals generally suffer from lattice defects and impurities that lead to charge trapping, which limits charge-collection efficiency, and may cause long-term polarization effects. Other solid-state materials, such as gallium arsenide, and gas detectors, are currently quite far from clinical implementation.

== Clinical applications ==
=== Improved dose efficiency ===
Photon-counting mammography allows for a reduction of patient dose while keeping image quality on par with conventional technologies, or, equivalently, improving image quality at equal dose. A study that compared photon-counting mammography to the state-wide average of the North Rhine-Westphalian mammography screening program in Germany reported a slightly improved diagnostic performance at a dose that was 40% of conventional technologies.

Improved dose efficiency in photon-counting mammography compared to conventional technologies is mainly enabled by:

- Rejection of electronic noise: A low-energy threshold is put below the expected incident spectrum and prevents electronic noise from being counted. However, electronic noise will still be added onto the pulse height and to some extent influence the energy resolution.
- Equal weighting of photons: Energy-integrating detectors intrinsically assign a higher weight to high-energy photons because more charge is released in the detector. This weighting is opposite to optimal because low-energy photons carry more contrast information. Photon-counting detectors, on the other hand, intrinsically weigh all photons equally, which is closer to optimal.
- Scatter rejection: The photon-counting mammography system uses a slit-scanning technique; the detector is made up of a number of thin lines and scanned across the object to acquire an image. The detector is equipped with matching pre- and post-patient collimators, which minimizes the acceptance angle while allowing for full detection of primary photons. Anti-scatter grids used for conventional detectors suffer from a trade-off between rejection of scatter and detection of primary photons. A slit-scanning configuration is not intrinsic to photon-counting detectors, but it is often practical to make room for the large amount of electronics.

=== Energy weighting ===
Even though equal weighting of photons, intrinsic to photon-counting detectors, improves dose efficiency compared to energy-integrating detectors, a higher weighting of low-energy photons is generally optimal because x-ray contrast drops with increasing photon energy when the photo-electric effect dominates and away from any absorption edges, which holds true for mammography without contrast agents. Photon-counting detectors allow for measuring the energy of impinging photons and therefore enable optimal weighting for a given imaging case. This technique, generally referred to as energy weighting, was pioneered for mammography applications by Cahn et al. At the limit of infinite energy resolution, energy weighting results in a CNR improvement of approximately 10% compared to equal weighting of photons, whereas studies with realistic energy resolution report CNR improvements of a few percent. The first results in clinical application were reported by Berglund et al. who was able to improve the CNR of clinical images by 2.2–5.2%, which translates to a potential dose reduction at a constant CNR in the range of 4.5%–11%.

=== Material decomposition and K-edge imaging ===
Photon-counting detectors can measure the energy spectrum of the incident photons, a technique broadly referred to as spectral imaging. Spectral information can be used to extract quantitative information about the composition of the object because the two dominant x-ray interaction effects at mammographic energies, the photo-electric effect and Compton scattering, have different energy and material dependencies. So-called material decomposition has been investigated to measure breast density, improve lesion visibility, characterize lesions, and to measure the attenuation of breast constituents.

High-atomic-number contrast agents add additional energy dependencies to the object and can be separated from soft tissue, often referred to as K-edge imaging. In photon-counting mammography, contrast-enhanced imaging has been focused on iodine imaging.

=== Tomosynthesis ===
Photon-counting breast tomosynthesis has been developed to a prototype state. Tomosynthesis relies on a number of low-dose projections, which makes the influence of electronic noise higher than for conventional mammography, and photon-counting detectors with rejection of electronic noise are therefore beneficial with potentially higher improvements in dose efficiency than for conventional mammography. Further, the slit-scanning technique is expected to provide additional benefit because scatter rejection based on conventional anti-scatter grids is challenging to implement at a range of projection angles. However, slit-scanning tomosynthesis requires larger modifications of existing systems, and the technique has so far not been applied in wide-spread clinical use. Applications of spectral imaging that have been investigated for photon-counting tomosynthesis include breast-density measurement, lesion characterization, and iodine K-edge imaging.

=== Phase-contrast imaging ===
The slit-scanning geometry of some implementations of photon-counting mammography offers advantages for implementation of grating-based phase-contrast imaging. Phantom studies and pre-clinical imaging has been conducted with this technique and initial promising results have been reported. The spectral resolution of photon-counting detectors can potentially be used to reduce the coherence requirements of phase-contrast imaging setups.
