= GXMO =

Licensing in the US for X-ray operators

GXMO (also fashioned as GxMO or GxmO) is an acronym for General X-Ray Machine Operator license. It may also refer to the licensing exam. Persons who possess this license may add this acronym after their name to demonstrate their qualification.

== See also ==
- Radiographer
- Medical radiography
