= Mónico Sánchez Moreno =

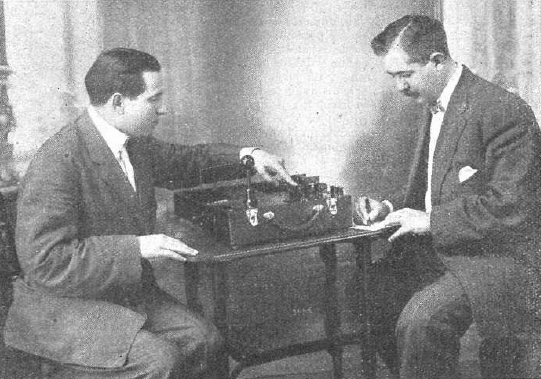
Mónico Sánchez Moreno demonstrating his portable x-ray machine to a doctor

Mónico Sánchez Moreno (4 May 1880 – 6 November 1961) was a Spanish electrical engineer, inventor and industrialist, an early developer of high frequency electrical conduction equipment, wireless telephony, radiology, electrotherapy, and the first portable x-ray machine in 1909.

== Early life ==
Sánchez was born in Piedrabuena, Ciudad Real, Spain, on 4 May 1880. His family owned a small tile and brick plant, and his mother took in laundry, which she washed in an area of the river known as the Tabla de la Yedra. He was the youngest of four children and helped his mother with the washing. At that time (data from 1900), Piedrabuena had a population of 3,810, 75% of whom were illiterate, and had a poor rural economy based on un-irrigated cereal crops and animal farming.

The teacher at the local school encouraged Mónico to continue his studies and, without finishing the lower level of High School, he left for Madrid with the intention of studying electrical engineering. Madrid in 1901 was in the process of introducing both electric street-lighting and electrified trams, replacing those pulled by animals.

However, the Electrical Engineering school was closed by student strikes, and Sánchez enrolled in a correspondence course in the subject offered by Joseph Wetzle from London. Despite knowing no English at that time, he followed the course diligently for three years. When he finished Joseph Wetzle contacted him and personally recommended him for a position at a company in New York.

== United States ==
In 1904 Mónico Sánchez, at the age of 23, sailed from Cádiz to New York. He worked as assistant to a draughtsman, but then began studies at the Institute of Electrical Engineers, He later took a course at the University of Columbia.

He first worked as an engineer at van Houten and ten Broek, a company which introduced electricity to hospitals. It was there that he invented a portable x-ray machine. It weighed scarcely 10 kg, as opposed to the 400 kg of the normal devices.

The Collins Wireless Telephone Company hired Sánchez as chief engineer, in order to sell his portable x-ray machine, under the name The Collins Sánchez Portable Device. He was offered $500,000 for his invention.

== Piedrabuena ==
After a dispute with Frederick Collins over the manufacture of his wireless telephone, Mónico Sánchez Moreno returned to his hometown Piedrabuena where he successfully established a plant to design and manufacture his devices in 1912. This ended in the Spanish Civil War.

Sánchez died in Piedrabuena on 6 November 1961.
