= Contrast resolution =

Contrast resolution is the ability to distinguish between differences in intensity in an image.

== Mathematics ==
Image contrast can be expressed mathematically as:

$$C = \frac{S_A-S_B}{S_A+S_B}$$

where S_{A} and S_{B} are signal intensities for signal-producing structures A and B in the region of interest. A disadvantage of this definition is that the contrast C can be negative. An alternative definition is:

$$C = \frac {|S_A-S_B|}{S_\mathrm{ref}}$$

where S_{ref} is a reference signal intensity, which is independent of the type of signal-producing structure under investigation.

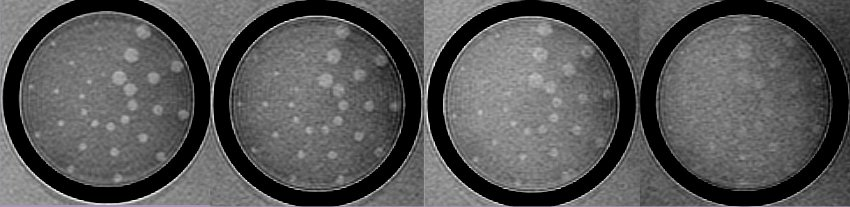
This series of pictures shows that the number of row of holes that are perceived decreases as the image contrast decreases from 5.1% to 3.7% to 2.2% to 1% (left to right)

== Medical imaging ==
The measure is used in radiology to quantify the quality of acquired images. It is a difficult quantity to define because it depends on the human observer as much as the quality of the actual image. For example, the size of a feature affects how easily it is detected by the observer.

In MRI, determining contrast is of high importance for calibration because the operator has a high degree of control of how the signal intensities of various structures vary in the images by using different MRI methods and imaging parameters. Unlike most other imaging modalities, such as x-ray CT in which the Hounsfield units value for water is set to zero, there is no standard reference signal for MRI. Thus the contrast-to-noise ratio is often employed as an index for contrast because this metric does not require a reference signal.

Contrast resolution or contrast-detail is an approach to describing the image quality in terms of both the image contrast and resolution.

Contrast resolution is usually measured by generating a pattern from a test object that depicts how image contrast changes as the structures being imaged get smaller and closer together. The picture below shows one such set of images produced using the low contrast detectability inserts of the phantom employed in the MRI accreditation program of the American College of Radiology.

== See also ==
- Contrast-to-noise ratio
- Spatial resolution
