= Radiography =

Imaging technique using radiation

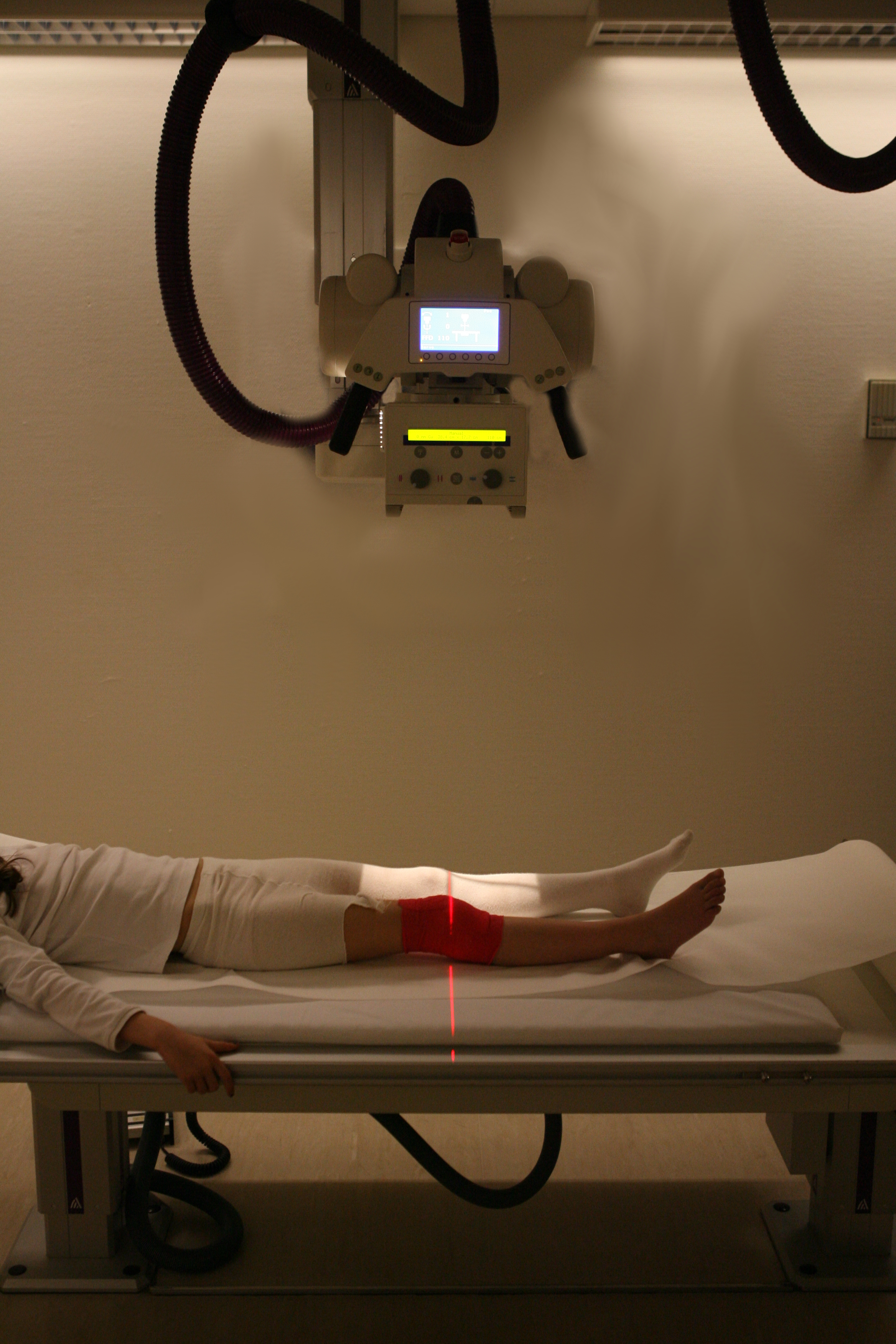
- Projectional radiography of the knee in a modern X-ray machine
- System: Musculoskeletal
- Subdivisions: Interventional, Nuclear, Therapeutic, Paediatric
- Significant diseases: Cancer, bone fractures
- Significant tests: screening tests, X-ray, CT, MRI, PET, bone scan, ultrasonography, mammography, fluoroscopy
- Specialist: Radiographer

Radiography is an imaging technique using X-rays, gamma rays, or similar ionizing radiation and non-ionizing radiation to view the internal form of an object. Applications of radiography include medical (diagnostic radiography and therapeutic radiography) and industrial radiography. Radiographic techniques are also used in airport security, where "body scanners" generally use backscatter X-ray.

To create an image in conventional radiography, a beam of X-rays is produced by an X-ray generator and then projected towards the object. A certain amount of the X-rays or other radiation are absorbed by the object, dependent on the object's density and structural composition. The X-rays that pass through the object are captured behind the object by a detector (either photographic film or a digital detector). The generation of flat two-dimensional images by this technique is called projectional radiography.

In computed tomography (CT scanning), an X-ray source and its associated detectors rotate around the subject, which itself moves through the conical X-ray beam produced. Any given point within the subject is crossed from many directions by many different beams at different times. Information regarding the attenuation of these beams is collated and subjected to computation to generate two-dimensional images on three planes (axial, coronal, and sagittal) which can be further processed to produce a three-dimensional image.

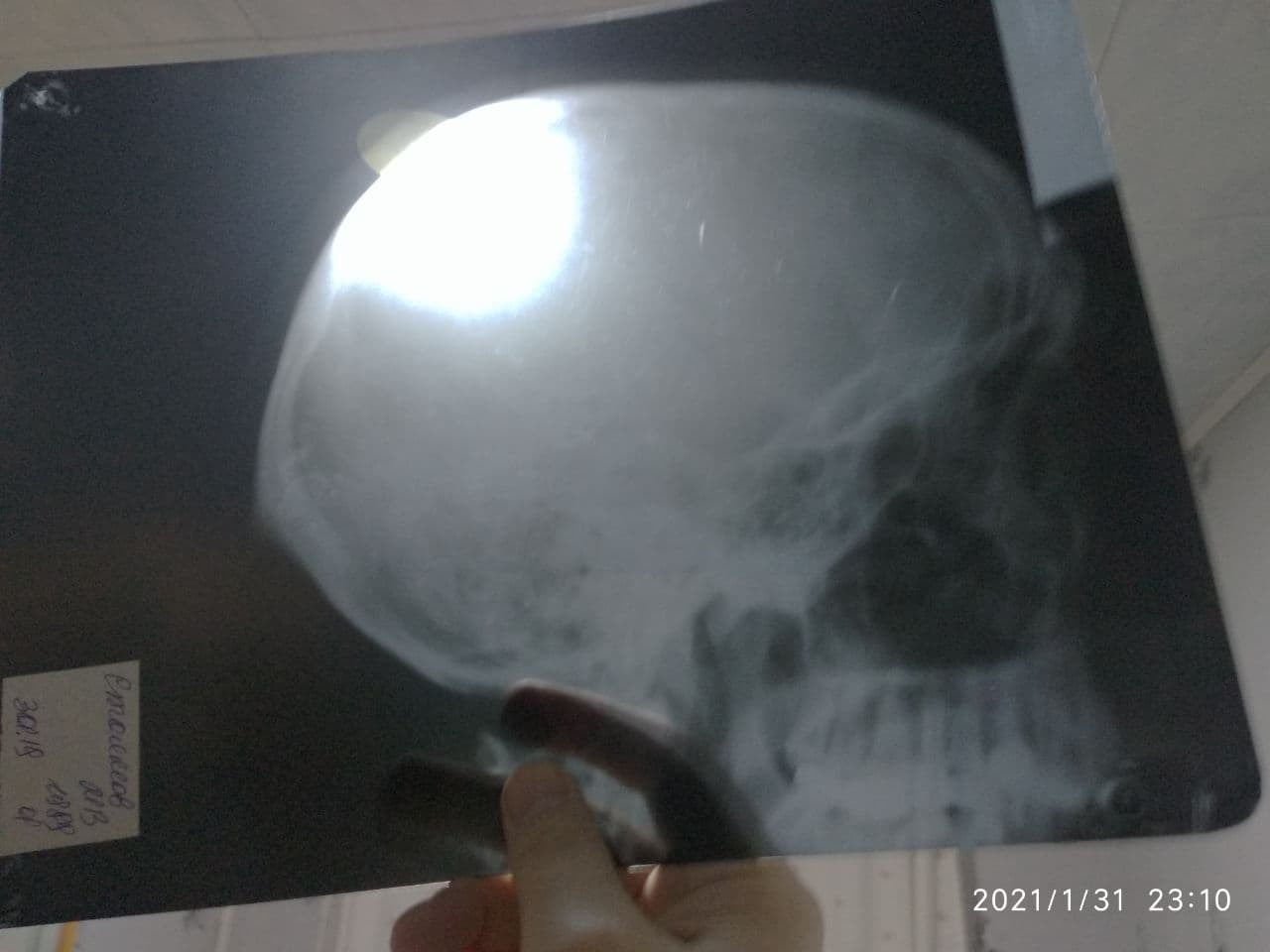
A medical radiograph of a skull

== History ==
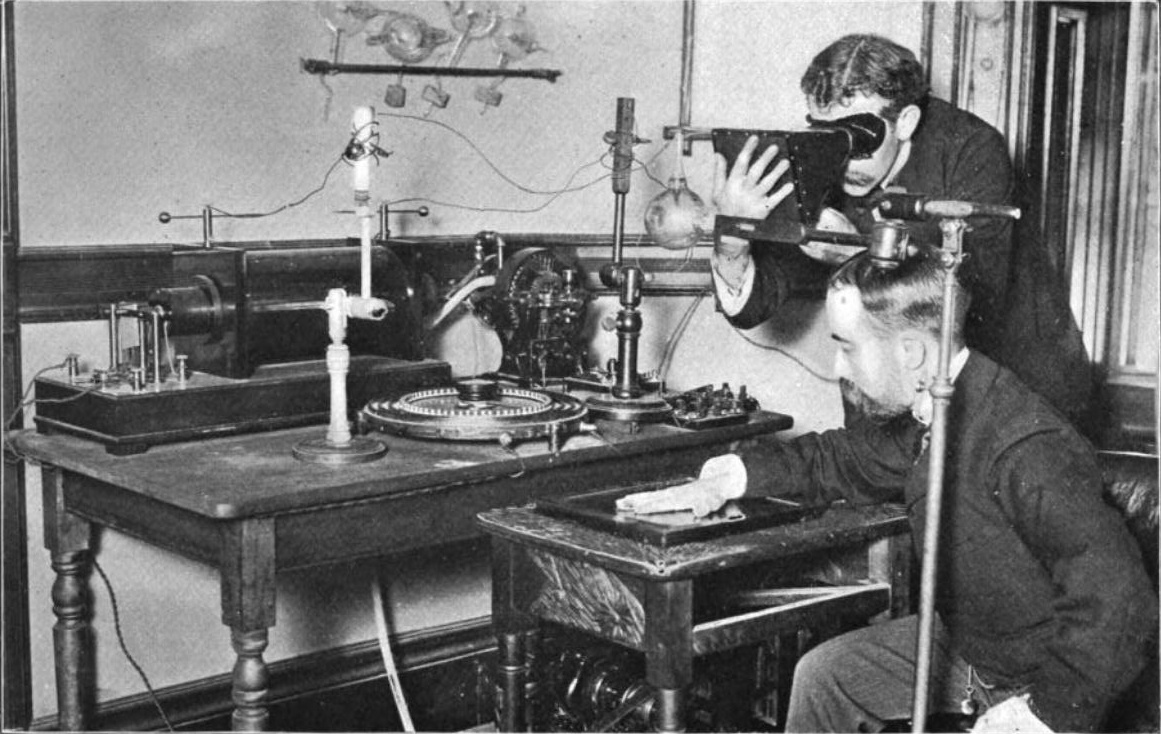
Taking an X-ray image with early Crookes tube apparatus, late 1800s

Radiography's origins and fluoroscopy's origins can both be traced to 8 November 1895, when German physics professor Wilhelm Conrad Röntgen discovered the X-ray and noted that, while it could pass through human tissue, it could not pass through bone or metal. Röntgen referred to the radiation as "X", to indicate that it was an unknown type of radiation. He received the first Nobel Prize in Physics for his discovery.

There are conflicting accounts of his discovery because Röntgen had his lab notes burned after his death, but this is a likely reconstruction by his biographers: Röntgen was investigating cathode rays using a fluorescent screen painted with barium platinocyanide and a Crookes tube which he had wrapped in black cardboard to shield its fluorescent glow. He noticed a faint green glow from the screen, about 1 metre away. Röntgen realized some invisible rays coming from the tube were passing through the cardboard to make the screen glow: they were passing through an opaque object to affect the film behind it.

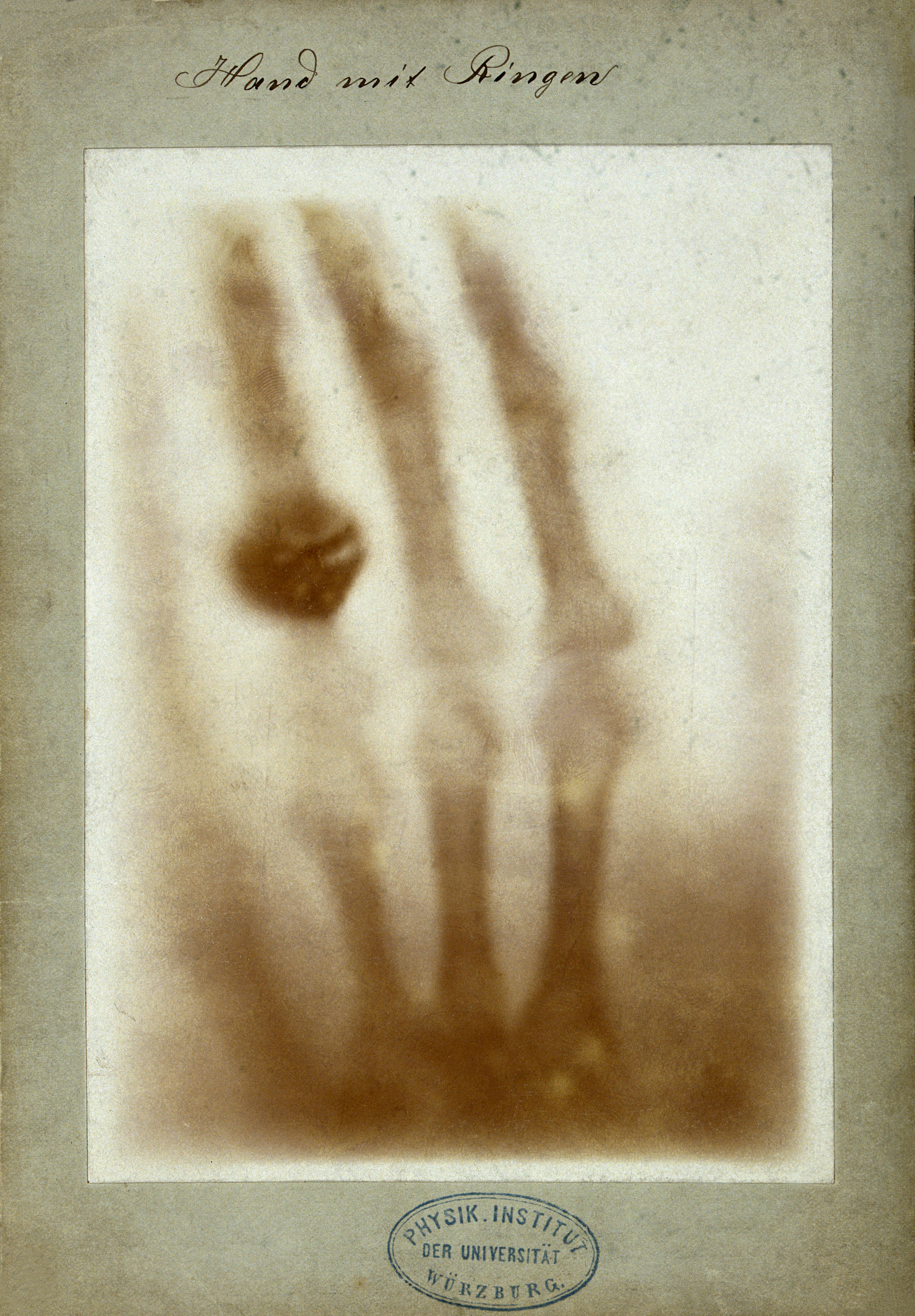
The first radiograph based on the left hand of Anna Bertha Röntgen.

Röntgen discovered X-rays' medical use when he made a picture of his wife's hand on a photographic plate formed due to X-rays. The photograph of his wife's hand was the first ever photograph of a human body part using X-rays. When she saw the picture, she said, "I have seen my death."

The first use of X-rays under clinical conditions was by John Hall-Edwards in Birmingham, England, on 11 January 1896, when he radiographed a needle stuck in the hand of an associate. On 14 February 1896, Hall-Edwards also became the first to use X-rays in a surgical operation.

The United States saw its first medical X-ray obtained using a discharge tube of Ivan Pulyui's design. In January 1896, on reading of Röntgen's discovery, Frank Austin of Dartmouth College tested all of the discharge tubes in the physics laboratory and found that only the Pulyui tube produced X-rays. This was a result of Pulyui's inclusion of an oblique "target" of mica, used for holding samples of fluorescent material, within the tube. On 3 February 1896 Gilman Frost, professor of medicine at the college, and his brother Edwin Frost, professor of physics, exposed the wrist of Eddie McCarthy, whom Gilman had treated some weeks earlier for a fracture, to the X-rays and collected the resulting image of the broken bone on gelatin photographic plates obtained from Howard Langill, a local photographer also interested in Röntgen's work.

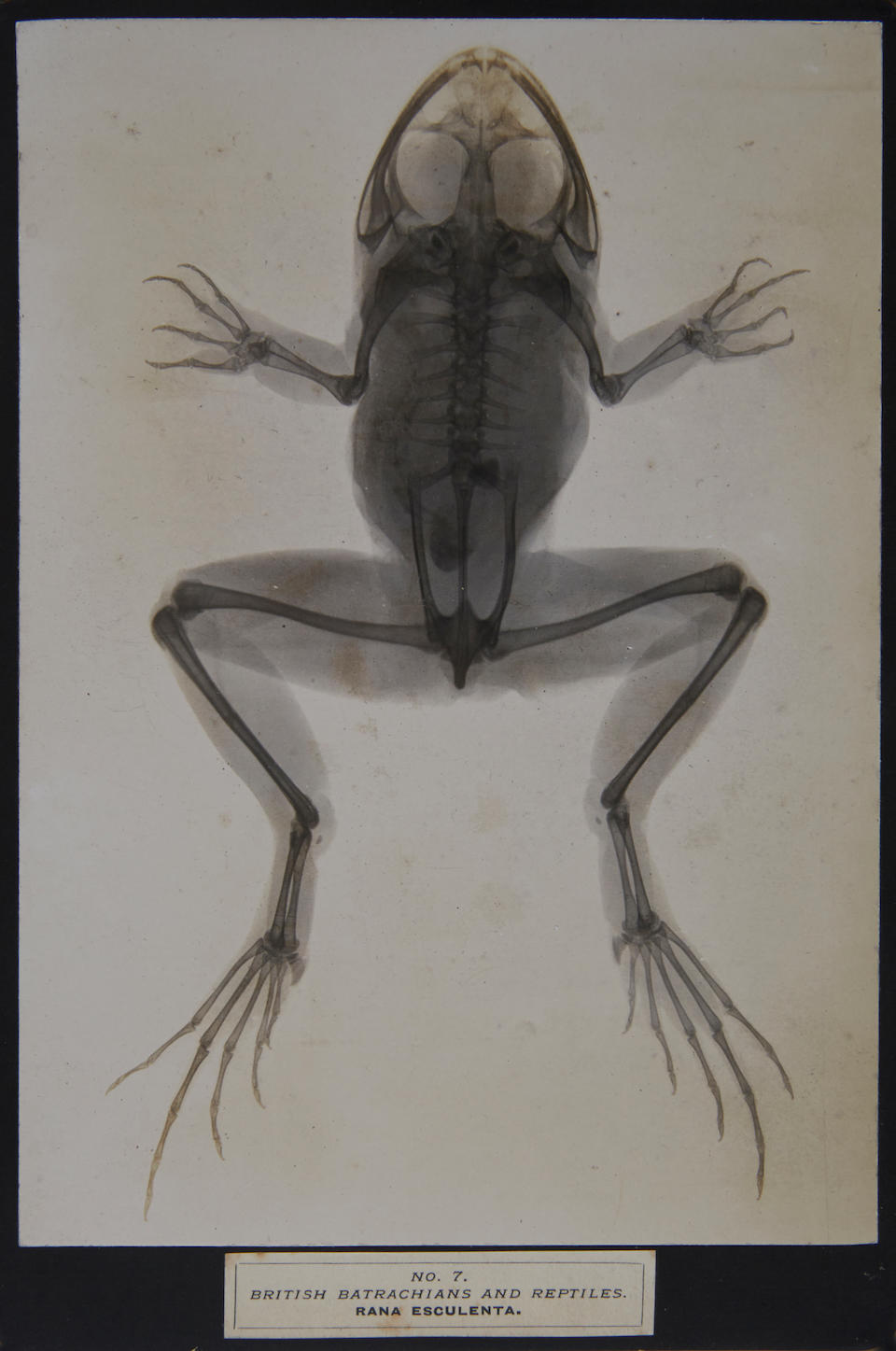
1897 sciagraph (X-ray photograph) of Pelophylax lessonae (then Rana Esculenta), from James Green & James H. Gardiner's "Sciagraphs of British Batrachians and Reptiles"

X-rays were put to diagnostic use very early; for example, Alan Archibald Campbell-Swinton opened a radiographic laboratory in the United Kingdom in 1896, before the dangers of ionizing radiation were discovered. Indeed, Marie Curie pushed for radiography to be used to treat wounded soldiers in World War I. Initially, many kinds of staff conducted radiography in hospitals, including physicists, photographers, physicians, nurses, and engineers. The medical speciality of radiology grew up over many years around the new technology. When new diagnostic tests were developed, it was natural for the radiographers to be trained in and to adopt this new technology. Radiographers now perform fluoroscopy, computed tomography, mammography, ultrasound, nuclear medicine and magnetic resonance imaging as well. Although a nonspecialist dictionary might define radiography quite narrowly as "taking X-ray images", this has long been only part of the work of "X-ray departments", radiographers, and radiologists. Initially, radiographs were known as roentgenograms, while skiagrapher (from the Ancient Greek words for "shadow" and "writer") was used until about 1918 to mean radiographer. The Japanese term for the radiograph, rentogen (レントゲン), shares its etymology with the original German (and English) term.

== Medical uses ==
Radiography
- ICD-9-CM: 87, 88.0-88.6
- MeSH: D011859
- OPS-301 code: 3–10...3–13, 3–20...3–26

Since the body is made up of various substances with differing densities, ionising and non-ionising radiation can be used to reveal the internal structure of the body on an image receptor by highlighting these differences using attenuation, or in the case of ionising radiation, the absorption of X-ray photons by the denser substances (like calcium-rich bones). The discipline involving the study of anatomy through the use of radiographic images is known as radiographic anatomy. Medical radiography acquisition is generally carried out by radiographers, while image analysis is generally done by radiologists. Some radiographers also specialise in image interpretation. Medical radiography includes a range of modalities producing many different types of image, each of which has a different clinical application.

=== Projectional radiography ===
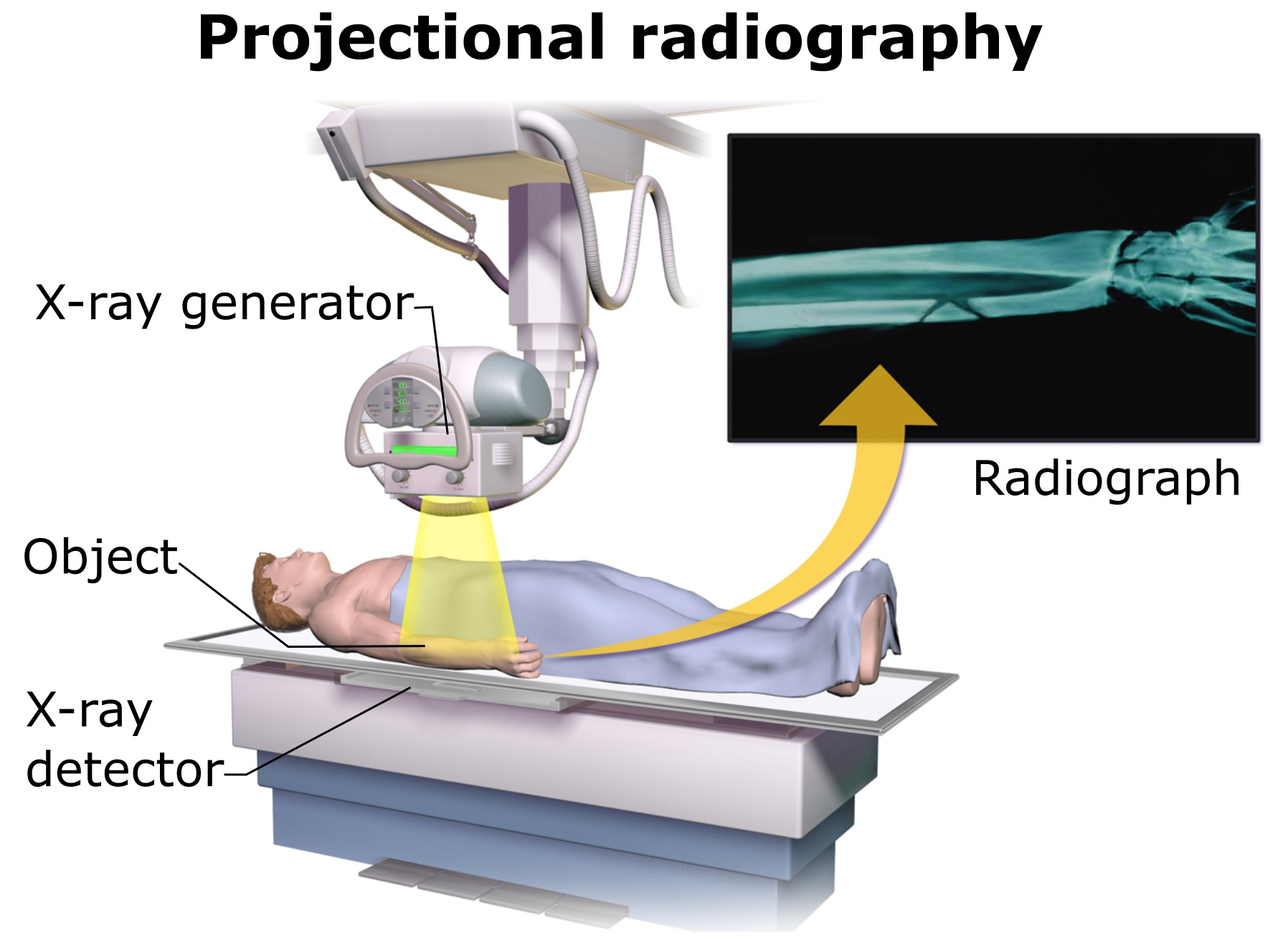
Acquisition of projectional radiography, with an X-ray generator and a detector

The creation of images by exposing an object to X-rays or other high-energy forms of electromagnetic radiation and capturing the resulting remnant beam (or "shadow") as a latent image is known as "projection radiography". The "shadow" may be converted to light using a fluorescent screen, which is then captured on photographic film, it may be captured by a phosphor screen to be "read" later by a laser (CR), or it may directly activate a matrix of solid-state detectors (DR—similar to a very large version of a CCD in a digital camera). Bone and some organs (such as lungs) especially lend themselves to projection radiography. It is a relatively low-cost investigation with a high diagnostic yield. The difference between soft and hard body parts stems mostly from the fact that carbon has a very low X-ray cross section compared to calcium.

=== Computed tomography ===
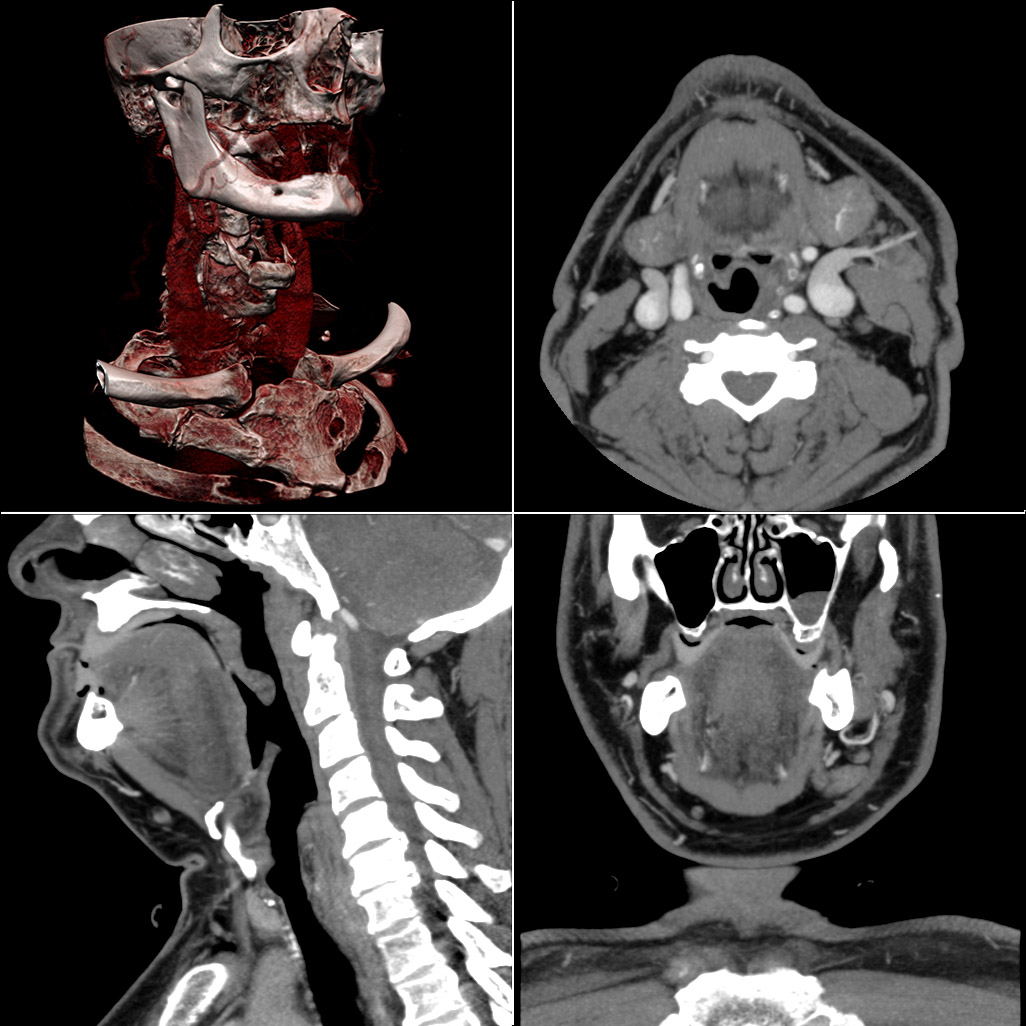
Images generated from computed tomography, including a 3D rendered image at upper left

Computed tomography or CT scan (previously known as CAT scan, the "A" standing for "axial") uses ionizing radiation (x-ray radiation) in conjunction with a computer to create images of both soft and hard tissues. These images look as though the patient was sliced like bread (thus, "tomography" – "tomo" means "slice"). Though CT uses a higher amount of ionizing x-radiation than diagnostic x-rays (both utilising X-ray radiation), with advances in technology, levels of CT radiation dose and scan times have reduced. CT exams are generally short, most lasting only as long as a breath-hold, Contrast agents are also often used, depending on the tissues needing to be seen. Radiographers perform these examinations, sometimes in conjunction with a radiologist (for instance, when a radiologist performs a CT-guided biopsy).

=== Dual energy X-ray absorptiometry ===
DEXA, or bone densitometry, is used primarily for osteoporosis tests. It is not projection radiography, as the X-rays are emitted in two narrow beams that are scanned across the patient, 90 degrees from each other. Usually the hip (head of the femur), lower back (lumbar spine), or heel (calcaneum) are imaged, and the bone density (amount of calcium) is determined and given a number (a T-score). It is not used for bone imaging, as the image quality is not good enough to make an accurate diagnostic image for fractures, inflammation, etc. It can also be used to measure total body fat, though this is not common. The radiation dose received from DEXA scans is very low, much lower than projection radiography examinations.

=== Fluoroscopy ===
Fluoroscopy is a term invented by Thomas Edison during his early X-ray studies. The name refers to the fluorescence he saw while looking at a glowing plate bombarded with X-rays.

The technique provides moving projection radiographs. Fluoroscopy is mainly performed to view movement (of tissue or a contrast agent), or to guide a medical intervention, such as angioplasty, pacemaker insertion, or joint repair/replacement. The last can often be carried out in the operating theatre, using a portable fluoroscopy machine called a C-arm. It can move around the surgery table and make digital images for the surgeon. Biplanar Fluoroscopy works the same as single plane fluoroscopy except displaying two planes at the same time. The ability to work in two planes is important for orthopedic and spinal surgery and can reduce operating times by eliminating re-positioning.

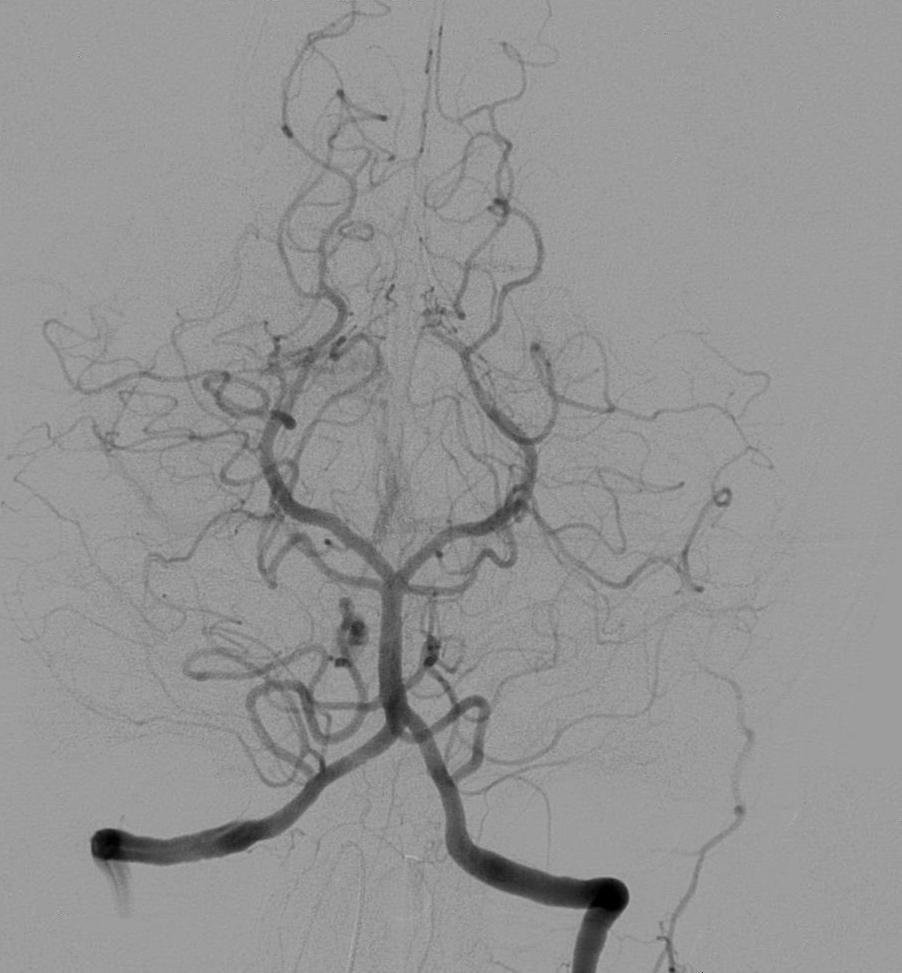
Angiogram showing a transverse projection of the vertebro basilar and posterior cerebral circulation

Angiography is the use of fluoroscopy to view the cardiovascular system. An iodine-based contrast is injected into the bloodstream and watched as it travels around. Since liquid blood and the vessels are not very dense, a contrast with high density (like the large iodine atoms) is used to view the vessels under X-ray. Angiography is used to find aneurysms, leaks, blockages (thromboses), new vessel growth, and placement of catheters and stents. Balloon angioplasty is often done with angiography.

=== Contrast radiography ===
Contrast radiography uses a radiocontrast agent, a type of contrast medium, to make the structures of interest stand out visually from their background. Contrast agents are required in conventional angiography, and can be used in both projectional radiography and computed tomography (called contrast CT).

=== Other medical imaging ===
Although not technically radiographic techniques due to not using X-rays, imaging modalities such as PET and MRI are sometimes grouped in radiography because the radiology department of hospitals handle all forms of imaging. Treatment using radiation is known as radiotherapy.

== Industrial radiography ==
Industrial radiography is a method of non-destructive testing where many types of manufactured components can be examined to verify the internal structure and integrity of the specimen. Industrial Radiography can be performed utilizing either X-rays or gamma rays. Both are forms of electromagnetic radiation. The difference between various forms of electromagnetic energy is related to the wavelength. X and gamma rays have the shortest wavelength and this property leads to the ability to penetrate, travel through, and exit various materials such as carbon steel and other metals. Specific methods include industrial computed tomography.

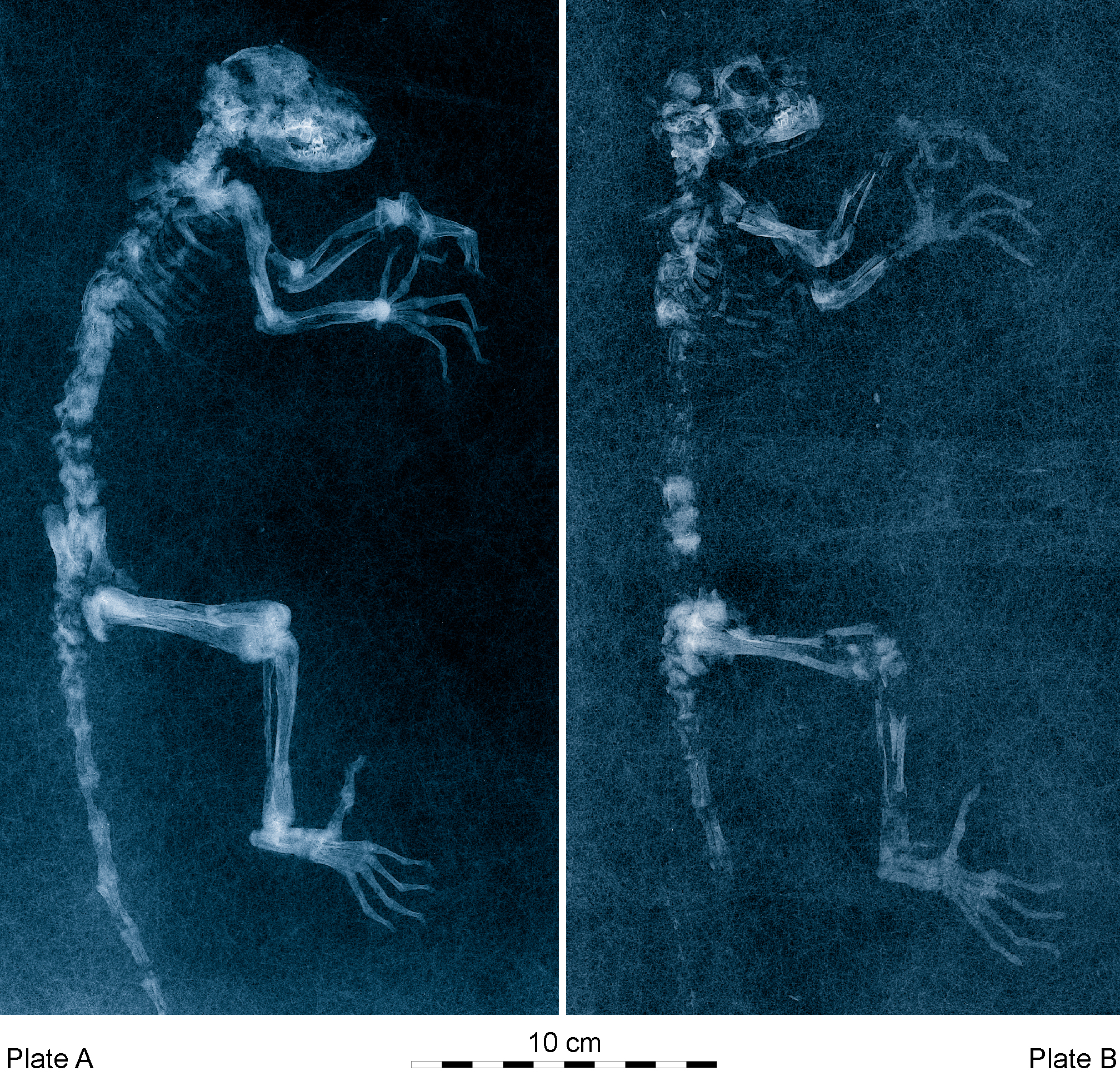
Radiography may also be used in paleontology, such as for these radiographs of the Darwinius fossil Ida.

== Image quality ==
Image quality will depend on resolution and density. Resolution is the ability of an image to show closely spaced structure in the object as separate entities in the image while density is the blackening power of the image. Sharpness of a radiographic image is strongly determined by the size of the X-ray source. This is determined by the area of the electron beam hitting the anode. A large photon source results in more blurring in the final image and is worsened by an increase in image formation distance. This blurring can be measured as a contribution to the modulation transfer function of the imaging system.

== Radiation dose ==
The dosage of radiation applied in radiography varies by procedure. For example, the effective dosage of a chest X-ray is 0.1 mSv, while an abdominal CT is 10 mSv. The American Association of Physicists in Medicine (AAPM) have stated that the "risks of medical imaging at patient doses below 50 mSv for single procedures or 100 mSv for multiple procedures over short time periods are too low to be detectable and may be nonexistent." Other scientific bodies sharing this conclusion include the International Organization of Medical Physicists, the UN Scientific Committee on the Effects of Atomic Radiation, and the International Commission on Radiological Protection. Nonetheless, radiological organizations, including the Radiological Society of North America (RSNA) and the American College of Radiology (ACR), as well as multiple government agencies, indicate safety standards to ensure that radiation dosage is as low as possible.

=== Shielding ===
X-rays generated by peak voltages below	Minimum thickness of lead (depending on machine)
75 kV	1.0 mm
100 kV	1.5 mm
125 kV	2.0 mm
150 kV	2.5 mm
175 kV	3.0 mm
200 kV	4.0 mm
225 kV	5.0 mm
300 kV	9.0 mm
400 kV	15.0 mm
500 kV	22.0 mm
600 kV	34.0 mm
900 kV	51.0 mm

Lead is the most common shield against X-rays because of its high density (11,340 kg/m^{3}), stopping power, ease of installation and low cost. The maximum range of a high-energy photon such as an X-ray in matter is infinite; at every point in the matter traversed by the photon, there is a probability of interaction. Thus there is a very small probability of no interaction over very large distances. The shielding of photon beam is therefore exponential (with an attenuation length being close to the radiation length of the material); doubling the thickness of shielding will square the attenuation factor (the probability of a photon penetrating the shielding).

Starting in the 1950s, personal lead shielding began to be used directly on patients for all X-rays over the abdomen with the intention of protecting the gonads (reproductive organs) or a fetus if the patient was pregnant. Dental X-rays would also typically additionally use lead shielding to protect the thyroid. However, a consensus was reached between 2019 and 2021 that lead shielding for routine diagnostic X-rays is not necessary and may in some cases be harmful. Personal shielding for medical professionals and other people in the room is still recommended.

Rooms where X-rays are performed are lined with lead. The table in this section shows the recommended thickness of lead shielding for a room where X-rays are performed as function of X-ray energy, from the Recommendations by the Second International Congress of Radiology.

=== Campaigns ===
In response to increased concern by the public over radiation doses and the ongoing progress of best practices, The Alliance for Radiation Safety in Pediatric Imaging was formed within the Society for Pediatric Radiology. In concert with the American Society of Radiologic Technologists, the American College of Radiology, and the American Association of Physicists in Medicine, the Society for Pediatric Radiology developed and launched the Image Gently campaign which is designed to maintain high quality imaging studies while using the lowest doses and best radiation safety practices available on pediatric patients. This initiative has been endorsed and applied by a growing list of various professional medical organizations around the world and has received support and assistance from companies that manufacture equipment used in radiology.

Following upon the success of the Image Gently campaign, the American College of Radiology, the Radiological Society of North America, the American Association of Physicists in Medicine, and the American Society of Radiologic Technologists have launched a similar campaign to address this issue in the adult population called Image Wisely. The World Health Organization and International Atomic Energy Agency (IAEA) of the United Nations have also been working in this area and have ongoing projects designed to broaden best practices and lower patient radiation dose.

=== Provider payment ===
Despite advice that emphasises only conducting radiographs when in the patient's interest, recent evidence suggests that they are used more frequently when dentists are paid under fee-for-service.

== Equipment ==
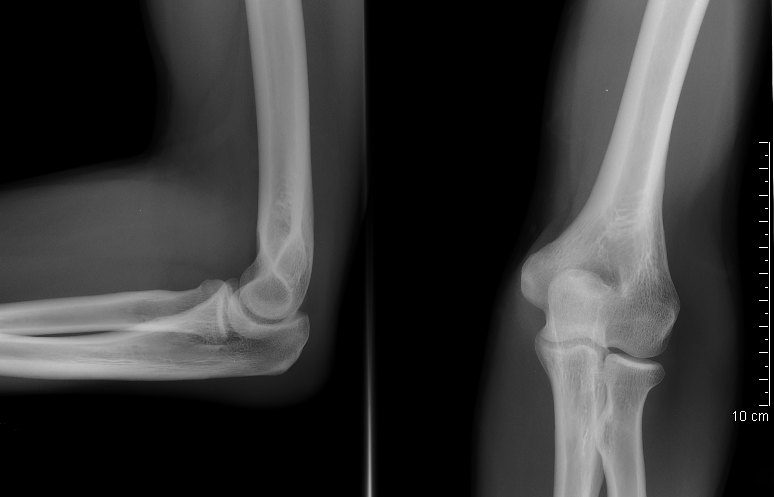
A plain radiograph of the elbow

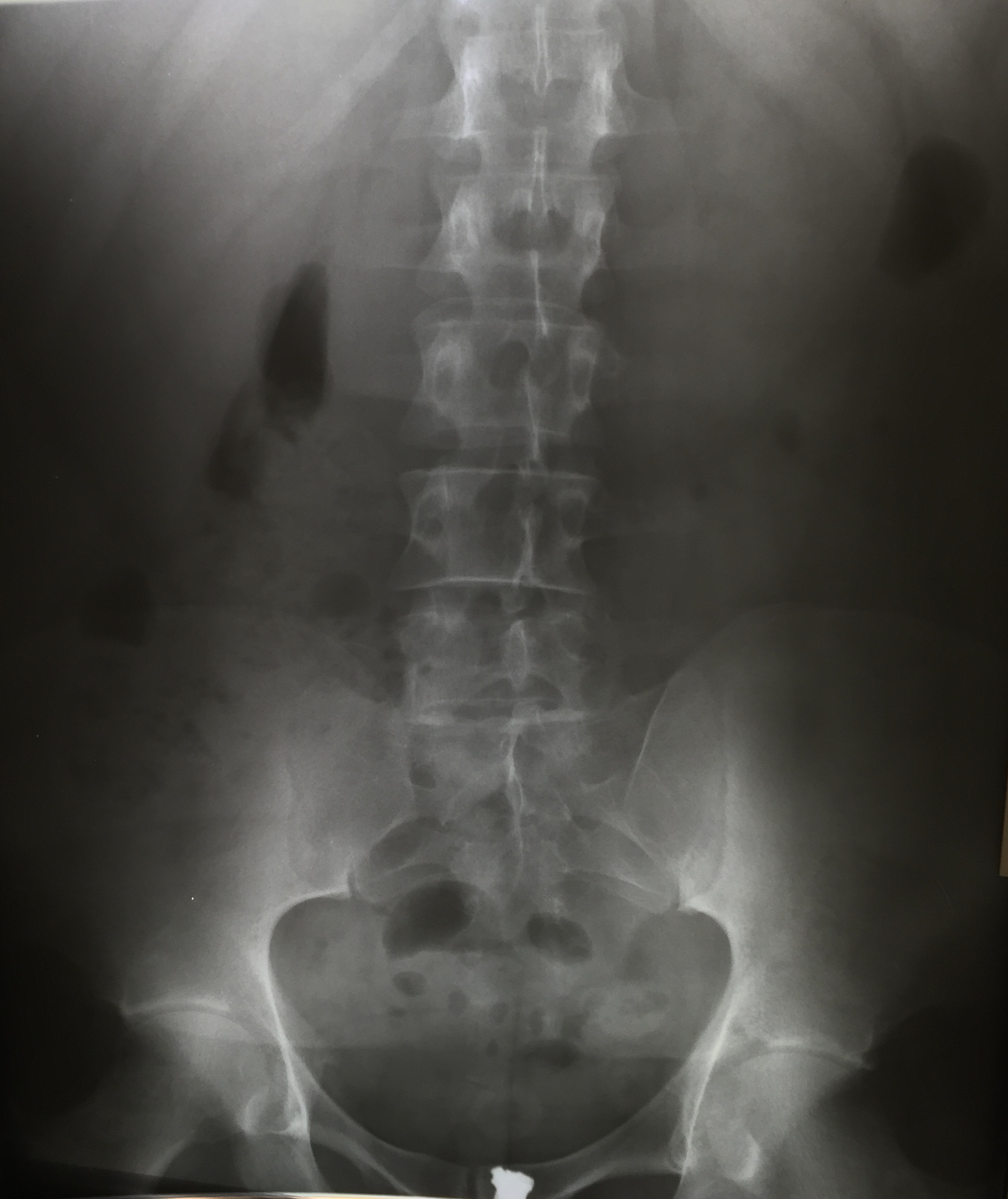
AP radiograph of the lumbar spine

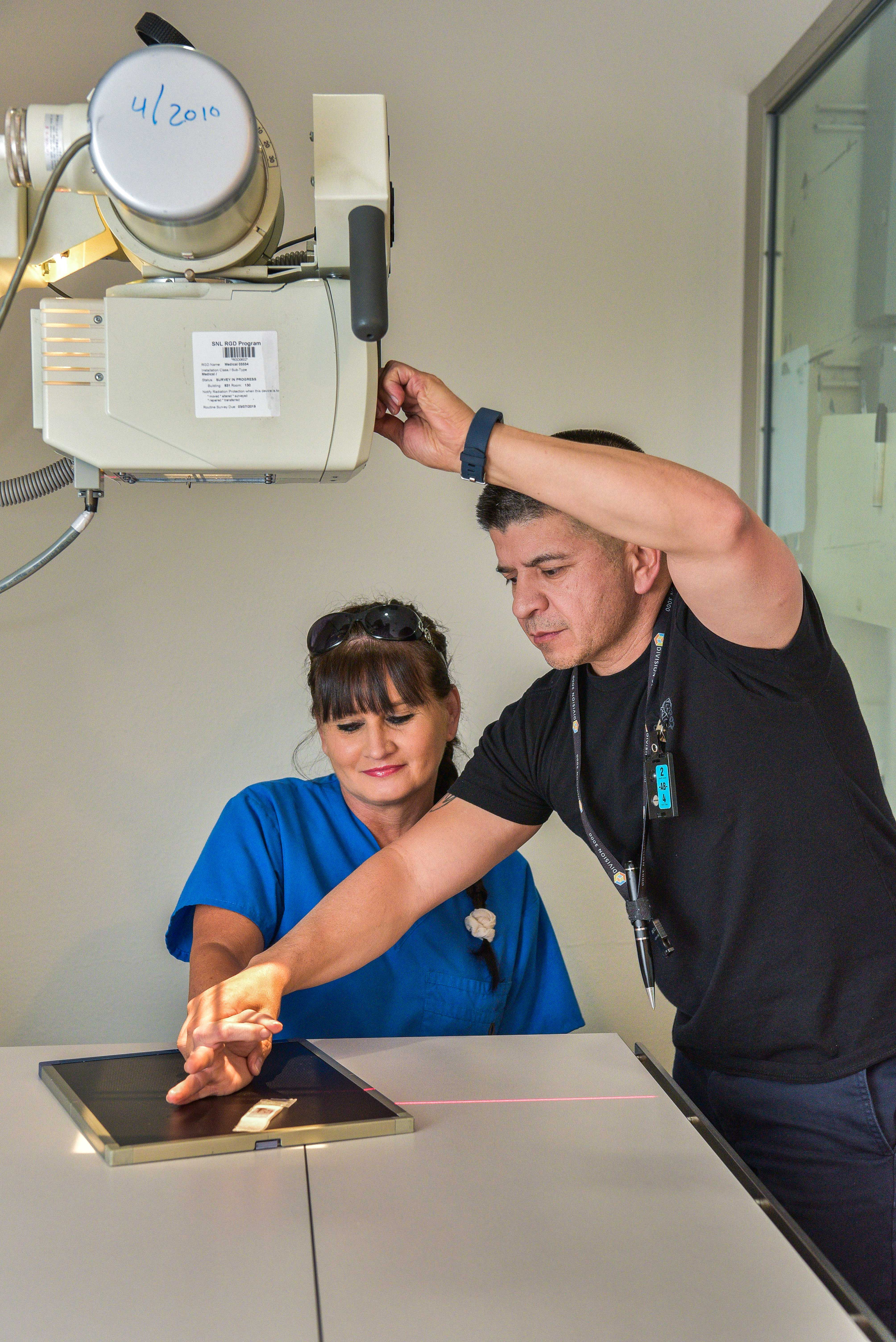
A hand prepared to be X-rayed

=== Sources ===
In medicine and dentistry, projectional radiography and computed tomography images generally use X-rays created by X-ray generators, which generate X-rays from X-ray tubes. The resultant images from the radiograph (X-ray generator/machine) or CT scanner are correctly referred to as "radiograms"/"roentgenograms" and "tomograms" respectively.

A number of other sources of X-ray photons are possible, and may be used in industrial radiography or research; these include betatrons, linear accelerators (linacs), and synchrotrons. For gamma rays, radioactive sources such as ^{192}Ir, ^{60}Co, or ^{137}Cs are used.

=== Grid ===
An anti-scatter grid may be placed between the patient and the detector to reduce the quantity of scattered x-rays that reach the detector. This improves the contrast resolution of the image, but also increases radiation exposure for the patient.

=== Detectors ===
Detectors can be divided into two major categories: imaging detectors (such as photographic plates and X-ray film (photographic film), now mostly replaced by various digitizing devices like image plates or flat panel detectors) and dose measurement devices (such as ionization chambers, Geiger counters, and dosimeters used to measure the local radiation exposure, dose, and/or dose rate, for example, for verifying that radiation protection equipment and procedures are effective on an ongoing basis).

=== Side markers ===
A radiopaque anatomical side marker is added to each image. For example, if the patient has their right hand x-rayed, the radiographer includes a radiopaque "R" marker within the field of the x-ray beam as an indicator of which hand has been imaged. If a physical marker is not included, the radiographer may add the correct side marker later as part of digital post-processing.

=== Image intensifiers and array detectors ===
As an alternative to X-ray detectors, image intensifiers are analog devices that readily convert the acquired X-ray image into one visible on a video screen. This device is made of a vacuum tube with a wide input surface coated on the inside with caesium iodide (CsI). When hit by X-rays, phosphor material causes the photocathode adjacent to it to emit electrons. These electrons are then focused using electron lenses inside the intensifier to an output screen coated with phosphorescent materials. The image from the output can then be recorded via a camera and displayed.

Digital devices known as array detectors are becoming more common in fluoroscopy. These devices are made of discrete pixelated detectors known as thin-film transistors (TFT) which can either work indirectly by using photo detectors that detect light emitted from a scintillator material such as CsI, or directly by capturing the electrons produced when the X-rays hit the detector. Direct detectors do not tend to experience the blurring or spreading effect caused by phosphorescent scintillators or by film screens since the detectors are activated directly by X-ray photons.

== Dual-energy ==
Dual-energy radiography is where images are acquired using two separate tube voltages. This is the standard method for bone densitometry. It is also used in CT pulmonary angiography to decrease the required dose of iodinated contrast.

== See also ==
- Autoradiograph – Radiograph made by recording radiation emitted by samples on photographic plates
- Background radiation – Measure of ionizing radiation in the environment
- Computer-aided diagnosis – Type of diagnosis assisted by computers
- GXMO – Licensing in the US for X-ray operators
- Imaging science – Representation or reproduction of an object's form
- List of civilian radiation accidents
- Medical imaging in pregnancy – Types of pregnancy imaging techniques
- Radiation – Waves or particles moving through space
- Digital radiography – Form of radiography
- Radiation contamination – Undesirable presence of radioactive substances
- Radiographer – Healthcare professional
- Thermography – Infrared imaging used to reveal temperature
