= Contrast-to-noise ratio =

Measure of determine image quality

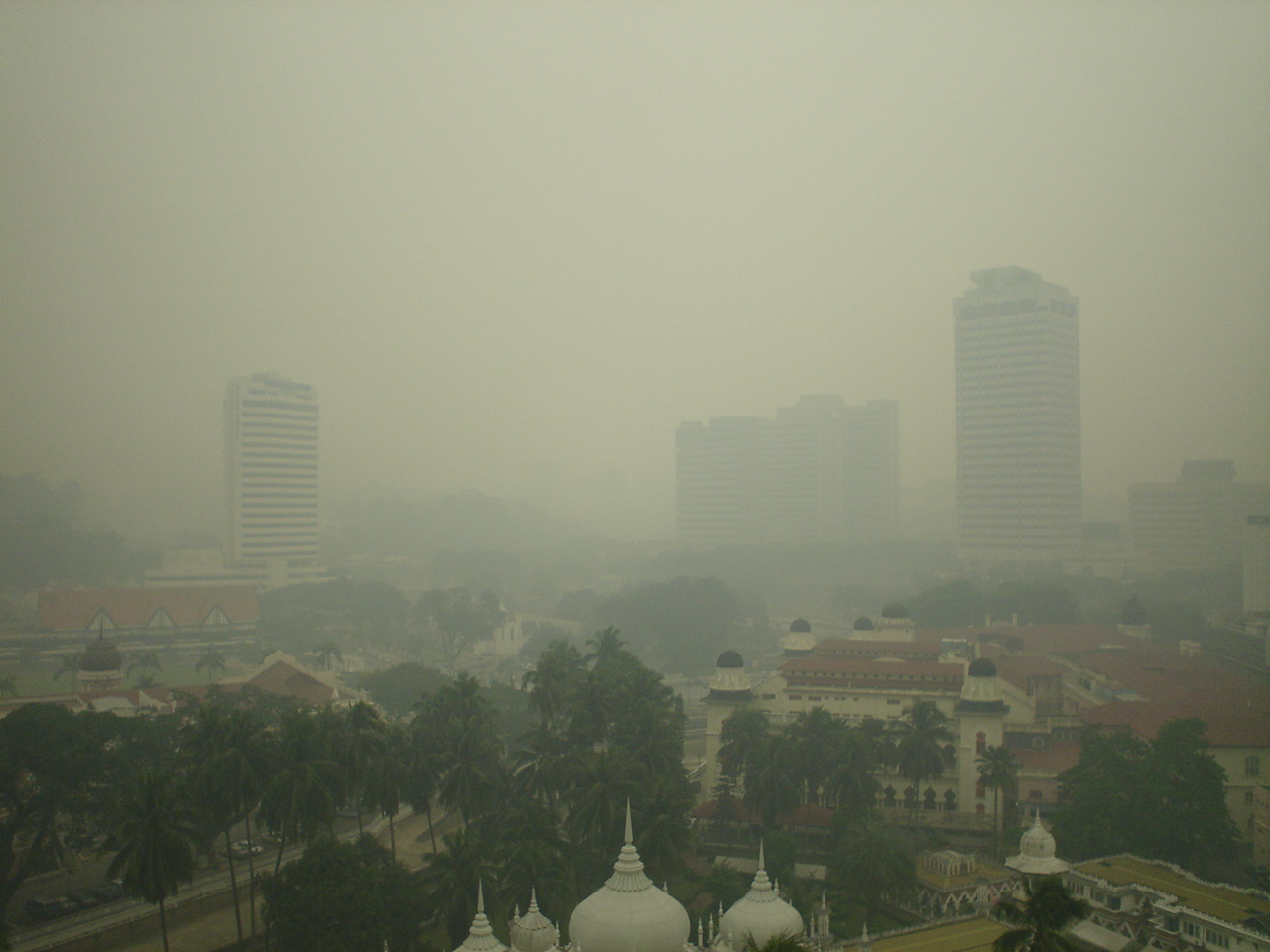
Haze over Kuala Lumpur.

Contrast-to-noise ratio (CNR) is a measure used to determine image quality. CNR is similar to the metric signal-to-noise ratio (SNR), but subtracts a term before taking the ratio. This is important when there is a significant bias in an image, such as from haze. As can be seen in the picture at right, the intensity is rather high even though the features of the image are washed out by the haze. Thus this image may have a high SNR metric, but will have a low CNR metric.

One way to define contrast-to-noise ratio is:

$$C = \frac{|S_A-S_B|}{\sigma_o}$$

where S_{A} and S_{B} are signal intensities for signal producing structures A and B in the region of interest and σ_{o} is the standard deviation of the pure image noise.

== See also ==
- Contrast resolution
