= Digital imaging =

Creation of a digitally encoded representation of the visual characteristics of an object

Digital imaging or digital image acquisition is the creation of a digital representation of the visual characteristics of an object, such as a physical scene or the interior structure of an object. The term is often assumed to imply or include the processing, compression, storage, printing and display of such images. A key advantage of a digital image, versus an analog image such as a film photograph, is the ability to digitally propagate copies of the original subject indefinitely without any loss of image quality.

Digital imaging can be classified by the type of electromagnetic radiation or other waves whose variable attenuation, as they pass through or reflect off objects, conveys the information that constitutes the image. In all classes of digital imaging, the information is converted by image sensors into digital signals that are processed by a computer and made output as a visible-light image. For example, the medium of visible light allows digital photography (including digital videography) with various kinds of digital cameras (including digital video cameras). X-rays allow digital X-ray imaging (digital radiography, fluoroscopy, and CT), and gamma rays allow digital gamma ray imaging (digital scintigraphy, SPECT, and PET). Sound allows ultrasonography (such as medical ultrasonography) and sonar, and radio waves allow radar. Digital imaging lends itself well to image analysis by software, as well as to image editing (including image manipulation).

== History ==
The first digital image was produced in 1920, by the Bartlane cable picture transmission system. British inventors, Harry G. Bartholomew and Maynard D. McFarlane, developed this method. The process consisted of "a series of negatives on zinc plates that were exposed for varying lengths of time, thus producing varying densities". The Bartlane cable picture transmission system generated at both its transmitter and its receiver end a punched data card or tape that was recreated as an image.

In 1957, Russell A. Kirsch produced a device that generated digital data that could be stored in a computer; this used a drum scanner and photomultiplier tube.

Digital imaging was developed in the 1960s and 1970s, largely to avoid the operational weaknesses of film cameras, for scientific and military missions including the KH-11 program. As digital technology became less expensive in later decades, it replaced film methods for many purposes.

In the early 1960s, while developing compact, lightweight, portable equipment for the onboard nondestructive testing of naval aircraft, Frederick G. Weighart and James F. McNulty (U.S. radio engineer) at Automation Industries, Inc., then, in El Segundo, California co-invented the first apparatus to generate a digital image in real-time, which image was a fluoroscopic digital radiograph. Square wave signals were detected on the fluorescent screen of a fluoroscope to create the image.

=== Digital image sensors ===
The charge-coupled device was invented by Willard S. Boyle and George E. Smith at Bell Labs in 1969. While researching MOS technology, they realized that an electric charge was the analogy of the magnetic bubble and that it could be stored on a tiny MOS capacitor. As it was fairly straightforward to fabricate a series of MOS capacitors in a row, they connected a suitable voltage to them so that the charge could be stepped along from one to the next. The charge coupled device (CCD) is a semiconductor circuit that was later used in the first digital video cameras for television broadcasting.

Early CCD sensors suffered from shutter lag. This was largely resolved with the invention of the pinned photodiode (PPD). It was invented by Nobukazu Teranishi, Hiromitsu Shiraki and Yasuo Ishihara at NEC in 1980. It was a photodetector structure with low lag, low noise, high quantum efficiency and low dark current. In 1987, the PPD began to be incorporated into most CCD devices, becoming a fixture in consumer electronic video cameras and then digital still cameras. Since then, the PPD has been used in nearly all CCD sensors and then CMOS sensors.

The NMOS active-pixel sensor (APS) was invented by Olympus in Japan during the mid-1980s. This was enabled by advances in MOS semiconductor device fabrication, with MOSFET scaling reaching smaller micron and then sub-micron levels. The NMOS APS was fabricated by Tsutomu Nakamura's team at Olympus in 1985. The CMOS active-pixel sensor (CMOS sensor) was later developed by Eric Fossum's team at the NASA Jet Propulsion Laboratory in 1993. By 2007, sales of CMOS sensors had surpassed CCD sensors.

=== Digital image compression ===
An important development in digital image compression technology was the discrete cosine transform (DCT). DCT compression is used in JPEG, which was introduced by the Joint Photographic Experts Group in 1992. JPEG compresses images to much smaller file sizes, and has become the most widely used image file format on the Internet.

=== Digital cameras ===
These different scanning ideas were the basis of the first designs of digital cameras. Early cameras took a long time to capture an image and were poorly suited for consumer purposes. It was not until the adoption of the CCD (charge-coupled device) that the use of digital cameras became widespread. The CCD became part of the imaging systems used in telescopes, the first black-and-white digital cameras in the 1980s. Color was eventually added to the CCD and is a usual feature of digital cameras today.

== Changing environment ==
The use of negatives and details about photographic exposure are foreign concepts to many, as the first digital image in 1920 led eventually to less expensive equipment, increasingly powerful yet simple software, and the growth of the Internet.

The constant advancement and production of physical equipment and hardware related to digital imaging has affected the environment surrounding the field. From cameras and webcams to printers and scanners, the hardware is becoming sleeker, thinner, faster, and less expensive. As the cost of equipment decreases, the market for new enthusiasts widens.

Online photo sharing has altered the cultural understanding of photography and the role of photographers. Platforms such as Flickr, Shutterfly, and Instagram provide users with the ability to distribute images globally, regardless of professional status. The accessibility of digital cameras and smartphones has contributed to photography shifting from a specialized or luxury medium to an everyday form of communication.

The subject matter of photographs has also expanded. Historically, photography often centered on portraits and family events. In the digital era, images encompass a wide range of subjects, including daily activities, objects, food, landscapes, and spontaneous moments. The integration of cameras into mobile devices enables individuals to document and share experiences instantly, contributing to photography's role as a continuous and immediate form of visual expression.

In 1826 Nicéphore Niépce was the first to develop a photo which used lights to reproduce images, the advancement of photography has drastically increased over the years. Everyone is now a photographer in their own way, whereas during the early 1800s and 1900s the expense of lasting photos was highly valued and appreciated by consumers and producers. According to the BBC, the digital camera caused the following: The impact on professional photographers has been dramatic. Photographers of the past would not waste a shot unless they were virtually certain it would work. "The use of digital imaging (photography) has changed the way we interacted with our environment over the years. Part of the world is experienced differently through visual imagining of lasting memories, it has become a new form of communication with friends, family and love ones around the world without face to face interactions. Through photography it is easy to see those that you have never seen before and feel their presence without them being around, for example Instagram is a form of social media where anyone is allowed to shoot, edit, and share photos of whatever they want with friends and family. Facebook, snapshot, vine and twitter are also ways people express themselves with little or no words and are able to capture every moment that is important. Lasting memories that were hard to capture, is now easy because everyone is now able to take pictures and edit it on their phones or laptops. Photography has become a new way to communicate and it is rapidly increasing as time goes by, which has affected the world around us."

A study done by Basey, Maines, Francis, and Melbourne in 2016 found that drawings used in class have a significant negative effect on lower-order content for student's lab reports, perspectives of labs, excitement, and time efficiency of learning. Documentation style learning has no significant effects on students in these areas. He also found that students were more motivated and excited to learn when using digital imaging.

== Field advancements ==
In the field of education.

- As digital projectors, screens, and graphics find their way to the classroom, teachers and students are benefitting from the increased convenience and communication they provide, although their theft can be a common problem in schools. In addition acquiring a basic digital imaging education is becoming increasingly important for young professionals. Reed, a design production expert from Western Washington University, stressed the importance of using "digital concepts to familiarize students with the exciting and rewarding technologies found in one of the major industries of the 21st century".

The field of medical imaging

- A branch of digital imaging that seeks to assist in the diagnosis and treatment of diseases, is growing at a rapid rate. A recent study by the American Academy of Pediatrics suggests that proper imaging of children who may have appendicitis may reduce the amount of appendectomies needed. Further advancements include amazingly detailed and accurate imaging of the brain, lungs, tendons, and other parts of the body—images that can be used by health professionals to better serve patients.
- According to Vidar, as more countries take on this new way of capturing an image, it has been found that image digitalization in medicine has been increasingly beneficial for both patient and medical staff. Positive ramifications of going paperless and heading towards digitization includes the overall reduction of cost in medical care, as well as an increased global, real-time, accessibility of these images.
- Digital Imaging in Communications and Medicine (DICOM) is a system for taking images of internal organs and also is helpful in processing those images. It incorporates image processing, sharing, and analyzing.

In the field of technology, digital image processing has become more useful than analog image processing.

- Image sharpen & reinstatement –
  - Improved picture or manipulating the pictures – this comprises the zooming process, the blurring process, the sharpening process, the gray scale to color translation process, the picture recovery process and the picture identification process.
- Facial Recognition –
  - A PC innovation that decides the positions and sizes of human faces in self-assertive digital pictures. It distinguishes facial components and overlooks whatever, for example, structures, trees & bodies.
- Remote detection –
  - Little or substantial scale procurement of data of article or occurrence, with the use of recording or ongoing detecting apparatus not in substantial or close contact with an article. Practically, remote detecting is face-off accumulation using an assortment of gadgets for collecting data on particular article or location.
- Pattern detection –
  - The study or investigation from picture processing – in the pattern detection, image processing is used for recognizing elements in the images and after that machine study is used to instruct a framework for variation in pattern. The pattern detection is used in computer-aided analysis, detection of calligraphy, identification of images, and more.
- Color processing –
  - Processing of colored pictures and diverse color locations which also involves study of transmit, store, and encode of color pictures.

== Augmented reality ==
Digital Imaging for Augmented Reality (DIAR) is a comprehensive field within the broader context of Augmented Reality (AR) technologies. It involves the creation, manipulation, and interpretation of digital images for use in augmented reality environments. DIAR plays a role in enhancing the user experience, providing realistic overlays of digital information onto the real world, thereby bridging the gap between the physical and the virtual realms.

DIAR is employed in sectors including entertainment, education, healthcare, military, and retail. In entertainment, DIAR is used to create gaming experiences and interactive movies. In education, it provides a more engaging learning environment, while in healthcare, it assists in surgical procedures. The military uses DIAR for training and battlefield visualization. In retail, customers can virtually try on clothes or visualize furniture in their home before making a purchase.

With continuous advancements in technology, the future of DIAR is expected to provide realistic overlays, improved 3D object modeling, and integration with the Internet of Things (IoT). The incorporation of haptic feedback in DIAR systems could further enhance the user experience by adding a sense of touch to the visual overlays. Additionally, advancements in artificial intelligence and machine learning are expected to further improve the context-appropriateness and realism of the overlaid digital images.

== Theoretical application ==
A major application that is in development is that of child safety and protection. Kodak's program, Kids Identification Digital Software (KIDS) include a digital imaging kit to be used to compile student identification photos, which would be useful during medical emergencies and crimes. As of 2012, more powerful and advanced versions of applications are developing, with increased features being tested and added.

Criminal investigation offices, such as police precincts, state crime labs, and federal bureaus have realized the importance of digital imaging in analyzing fingerprints and evidence, making arrests, and maintaining safe communities.

Digital imaging can be closely related to the social presence theory especially when referring to the social media aspect of images captured by mobile phones. There are many different definitions of the social presence theory but two that define what it is would be "the degree to which people are perceived as real" (Gunawardena, 1995), and "the ability to project themselves socially and emotionally as real people" (Garrison, 2000). Digital imaging allows persons to manifest their social life through images in order to give the sense of their presence to the virtual world. The presence of those images acts as an extension of oneself to others, giving a digital representation of what it is they are doing and who they are with. Digital imaging in the sense of cameras on phones helps facilitate this effect of presence with friends on social media. Alexander (2012) states, "presence and representation is deeply engraved into our reflections on images...this is, of course, an altered presence...nobody confuses an image with the representation reality. But we allow ourselves to be taken in by that representation, and only that 'representation' is able to show the liveliness of the absentee in a believable way." Therefore, digital imaging allows persons to be represented in a way so as to reflect their social presence.

Photography is a medium used to capture specific moments visually. Through photography, information can be sent (such as appearance) with little or no distortion. The Media Richness Theory provides a framework for describing a medium's ability to communicate information without loss or distortion. This theory has provided the chance to understand human behavior in communication technologies. Daft and Lengel (1984,1986) states the following:

"Communication media fall along a continuum of richness. The richness of a medium comprises four aspects: the availability of instant feedback, which allows questions to be asked and answered; the use of multiple cues, such as physical presence, vocal inflection, body gestures, words, numbers and graphic symbols; the use of natural language, which can be used to convey an understanding of a broad set of concepts and ideas; and the personal focus of the medium (pp. 83)."

The more a medium is able to communicate the accurate appearance, social cues and other such characteristics the more rich it becomes. Photography has become a natural part of how we communicate. For example, most mobile phones have the ability to send pictures in text messages. Apps Snapchat and Vine have become increasingly popular for communicating. Sites like Instagram and Facebook have also allowed users to reach a deeper level of richness because of their ability to reproduce information. Sheer, V. C. (January–March 2011). Teenagers' use of MSN features, discussion topics, and online friendship development: the impact of media richness and communication control. Communication Quarterly, 59(1).

== Methods ==
A digital photograph may be created directly from a physical scene by a camera or similar device. Alternatively, a digital image may be obtained from another image in an analog medium, such as photographs, photographic film, or printed paper, by an image scanner or similar device. Many technical images—such as those acquired with tomographic equipment, side-scan sonar, or radio telescopes—are actually obtained by complex processing of non-image data. Weather radar maps as seen on television news are a commonplace example. The digitalization of analog real-world data is known as digitizing, and involves sampling (discretization) and quantization. Projectional imaging of digital radiography can be done by X-ray detectors that directly convert the image to digital format. Alternatively, phosphor plate radiography is where the image is first taken on a photostimulable phosphor (PSP) plate which is subsequently scanned by a mechanism called photostimulated luminescence.

A digital image can also be computed from a geometric model or mathematical formula. In this case, the name image synthesis is more appropriate, and it is more often known as rendering.

Digital image authentication is an issue for the providers and producers of digital images such as health care organizations, law enforcement agencies, and insurance companies. There are methods emerging in forensic photography to analyze a digital image and determine if it has been altered.

Previously digital imaging depended on chemical and mechanical processes. Now these processes have converted to electronic. A few things need to take place for digital imaging to occur, the light energy converts to electrical energy – a grid with millions of solar cells. Each condition generates a specific electrical charge. Charges for each of these "solar cells" are transported and communicated to the firmware to be interpreted. The firmware interprets and translates the color and other light qualities. Pixels, with varying intensities, create and cause different colors, creating a picture or image. The firmware records the information for a future date and for reproduction.

== Advantages ==
There are several benefits of digital imaging. First, the process enables easy access of photographs and word documents. Google is at the forefront of this 'revolution,' with its mission to digitize the world's books. Such digitization will make the books searchable, thus making participating libraries, such as Stanford University and the University of California, Berkeley, accessible worldwide. Digital imaging also benefits the medical world because it "allows the electronic transmission of images to third-party providers, referring dentists, consultants, and insurance carriers via a modem". The process "is also environmentally friendly since it does not require chemical processing". Digital imaging is also frequently used to help document and record historical, scientific and personal life events.

Benefits also exist regarding photographs. Digital imaging reduces the need for physical contact with original images. Furthermore, digital imaging creates the possibility of reconstructing the visual contents of partially damaged photographs, thus eliminating the potential that the original would be modified or destroyed. In addition, photographers are "freed from being 'chained' to the darkroom," and have more time to shoot and are able to cover assignments more effectively. Digital imaging 'means' that "photographers no longer have to rush their film to the office, so they can stay on location longer while still meeting deadlines".

Another advantage to digital photography is that it has been expanded to camera mobile phones. Cameras can be taken with us as well as send photos instantly to others.

== Criticisms ==
Critics of digital imaging cite negative consequences including increased "flexibility in getting better quality images to the readers" which may tempt editors, photographers and journalists to manipulate photographs. In addition, "staff photographers will no longer be photojournalists, but camera operators... as editors have the power to decide what they want 'shot'".

== See also ==
- Digital image mosaic
- Digital image processing
- Digital photography
- Image editing
- Image retrieval
- Graphics file format
- Graphic image development
- Society for Imaging Science and Technology, (IS&T)
- Film recorder
- Photoplotter
