= World Health Imaging, Telemedicine, and Informatics Alliance =

Non-profit global health technology and social venture

World Health Imaging, Telemedicine and Informatics Alliance
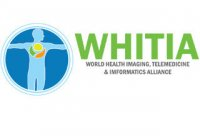
- Founded: Chicago, IL, US
- Founder: Mike Hoaglin, Dave Kelso, Matt Glucksberg, Michael Diamond
- Type: 501(c)(3) Non-profit Organization
- Purpose: Low-cost medical imaging, X-ray, Health Information technology, sustainability
- Location(s): Chicago, Illinois; United States
- Region served: Worldwide
- Key people: Newton N. Minow, Chair of the Board; Michael W. Ferro, Jr., Vice Chair; Ivy Walker, CEO
- Website: worldhealthimaging.org

The World Health Imaging, Telemedicine and Informatics Alliance (WHITIA) is a non-profit global health technology and social venture established in 2006 by affiliates of Northwestern University near Chicago, Illinois. WHITIA was formerly known as the World Health Imaging Alliance (WHIA) until it formally expanded its scope in June 2009.

WHITIA's first formal public launch was in April 2009 at the Healthcare Information and Management Systems Society (HIMSS) Annual Conference & Exhibition in Chicago, Illinois. WHITIA announced strategic partners including SEDECAL, Carestream Health and Merge Healthcare, receiving extensive coverage in Health IT magazines and publications. At the 2009 Annual Conference of the Society for Imaging Informatics in Medicine (SIIM) in Charlotte, North Carolina, WHITIA announced its partnership with SIIM, which will allow both organizations to collaborate on specific initiatives. WHITIA was recently ranked #15 of the top 25 most influential people, institutions, and organizations in the radiology industry.

At the 2009 RSNA Annual Meeting, WHITIA launched, Remi-d, a remote-operated screening X-ray system for use in the developing world. Its strengths in these areas stem from the higher burden of Human Immunodeficiency Virus (HIV) and Tuberculosis (TB) co-infection, high incidents of Black Lung disease, or outbreaks of other infectious respiratory diseases. The teleradiology and remote-controlled features of Remi-d allow resource-limited areas such as sub-Saharan Africa, South and Central America and Southeast Asia, where Radiologists and Radiographers are in short supply to have a functioning X-ray service.

WHITIA currently has pilot integrated digital X-ray sites in South Africa and Guatemala at established clinics in need and is expanding to new qualified sites in partnership with NGOs such as Rotary International while cooperating with the local and national governments.

== Guatemala clinics ==
The Guatemala pilot sites in urban Guatemala City and rural Río Hondo provide essential healthcare technology to thousands of people in the communities served. They are designed to be models for the wider expansion of the WHITIA network throughout the clinics in need in urban and rural Guatemala. The system's specific design for Guatemala City is an integration of some of WHITIA's partners' strengths and generosity:

- SEDECAL provides the X-ray generator and controls
- Carestream Health donates the computed radiography (CR) digital scanner and plates
- Kane X-ray donates personnel to perform installation and set up of the CR and PACS

This project was largely funded by several US and Guatemalan Rotary clubs along with the key resource support of the Guatemalan municipal and national governments.
