= X-RIS =

Belgian digital radiography company

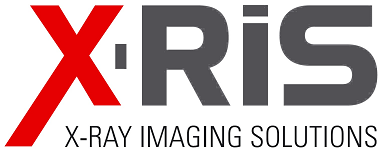
- Type: Private
- Industry: Manufacturing, Defense (military), Non-destructive testing
- Founded: 2010
- Headquarters: Liège, Belgium
- Key people: Nicolas Poelst (CEO), Christophe Greffe (CTO)
- Products: Digital X-ray, X-ray generator, Digital radiography
- Number of employees: 10 (2015), 14 (2016), 18 (2022).
- Website: www.xris.eu

X-RIS (for X-Ray Imaging Solutions) is a Belgian company based in Liège and active in the field of digital radiography in non-destructive testing and in security.

Founded in 2010, the company won the Belgium Deloitte Technology Fast 50 in 2015 and again in 2017. It has supplied x-ray solutions to Airbus, Safran, TOTAL, the TÜV. The company also supplied x-ray material to the FBI Academy at Quantico and to the training center of Huntsville, Alabama.

Company built its reputation on the user-friendliness of its software. In 2017, it launched the development of Automatic Defect Recognitions tools (ADR) in collaboration with several Walloon universities and companies » and in 2020 the projet AeroCT to use tomography (CT) in the aeronautical parts inspection.

== History ==
=== Development ===
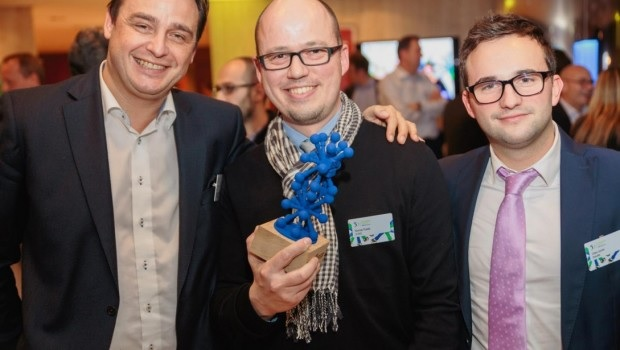
Nicolas Poelst (X-RIS Sales Director and co-founder) receives the 1st prize in the category IT and Digital Solutions at Deloitte Technology Fast 50 2015 challenge.

X-RIS is a start-up that was founded in 2010 at Liège. The company is specialised in the delivery of digital X-ray devices in NDT and in security.

The company designs and manufactures portable X-ray generators, flat panel detectors and stationary x-ray systems. It is active in the field of foundries and shipyards, in the aeronautics (Safran, Turbomeca, RAAF, SABCA, SONACA) and in the oil industry in which it supplies TOTAL. In security the applications are demining (EOD and IED), forensics, customs and counter-terrorism.

In 2011, the company developed a customised X-ray scanner for the Royal Museum for Central Africa of Belgium. The system was dedicated to the study of zoological specimens of the Institute, some more than 70 years old. In using two flat panels, the system can X-ray small specimen from 1 to 3 cm with a resolution of 48 μm up to snakes 1 m long.

End 2014, X-RIS wins a contract with the FBI Academy. According to journalist Eric Dagonnier, the system distinguishes itself by its « determining speed » that « realises the analysis in less than 20 seconds ». The contract was renewed in 2015 but this time for the Alabama training center.

=== Awards ===
In November 2015, the company wins the Deloitte Technology Fast 50 challenge rewarding the 50 technological enterprises with the highest growing rate in Belgium. X-RIS also comes first in the category IT & Digital Solutions for its innovation and performances. It wins once again in 2017 in the category hardware.

== Products and technologies ==
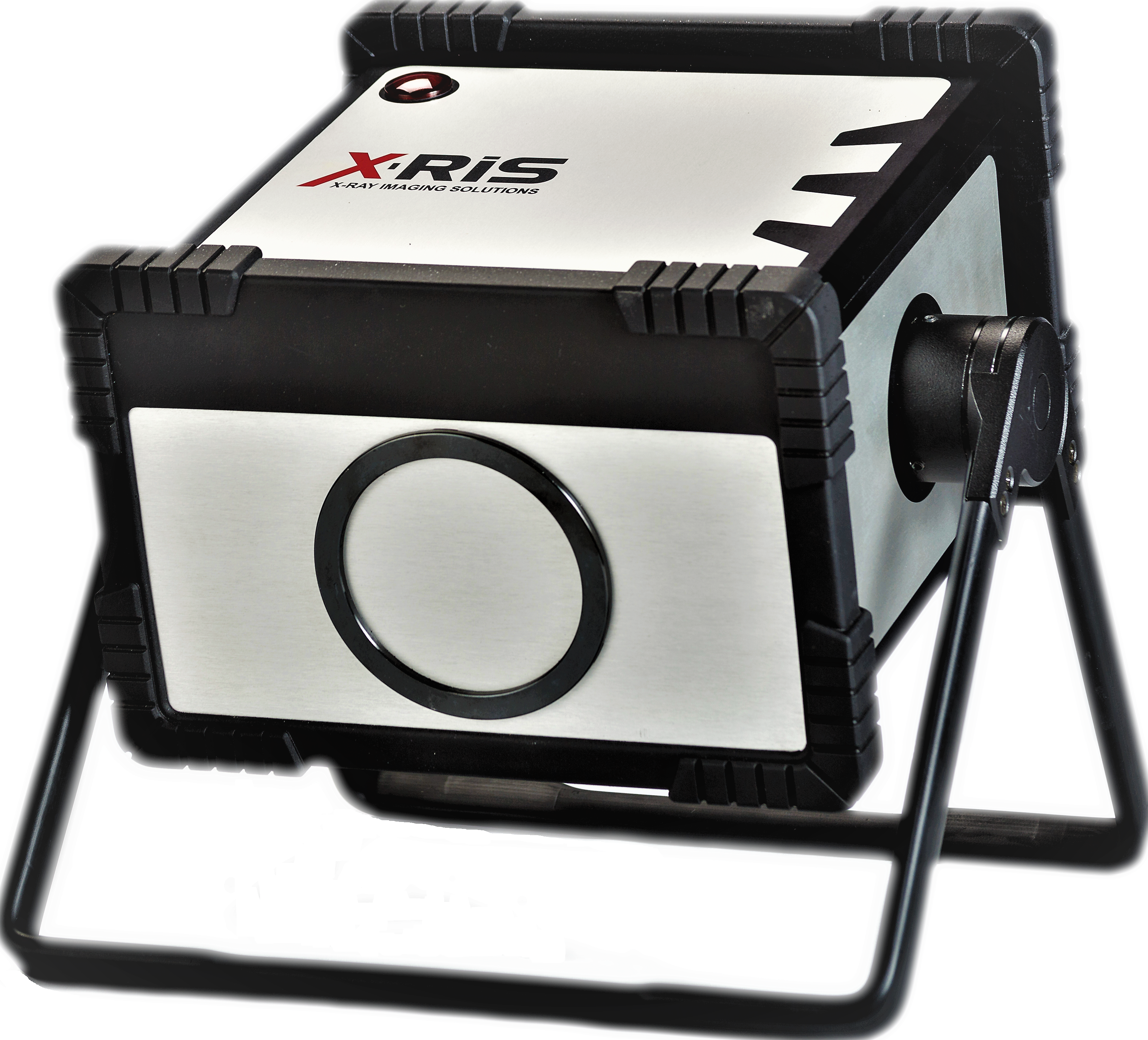
GemX-160 : portable X-ray generator dedicated to digital radiography in Non Destructive Testing (NDT); the device is battery-powered and remotely controlled.

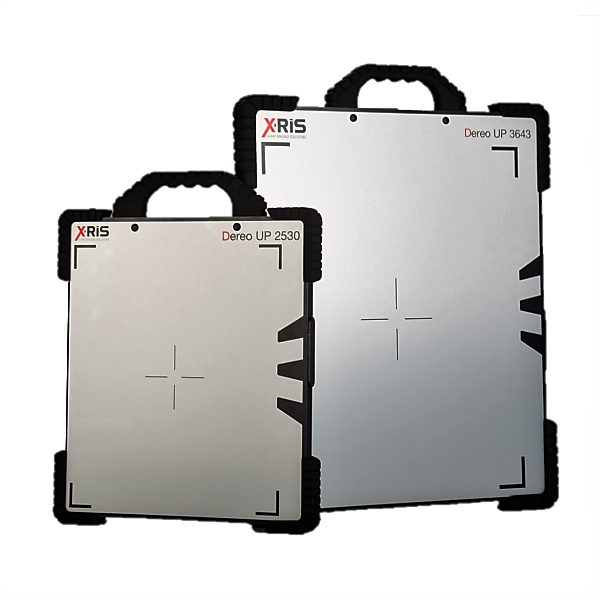
Dereo : rugged portable flat panel detectors for use on the field in shipyards or in aeronautics.

Digital X-ray can generate images on the spot for immediate analysis, for inspection and security duties including bomb detection and disposal, as a tool for VIP security and protection, searches for drug and contraband smuggling, customs offices, forensics and applications in Nondestructive testing (NDT) such as pipe inspections in refineries and the petrochemical industry, composite material testing in the aerospace industry as well as inspection of welding in shipyards and art and archeological artifacts.

The following products have been designed and are manufactured and supplied by X-RIS:

=== X-Ray generators ===
- GemX is a battery-powered, Wireless controlled, portable constant potential X-ray monobloc. It can operate up to 200 kV. The oil insulation offers a duty cycle of 2 hours of continuous X-ray per day. The small focal spot of 0.7 x 0.8 mm (EN 12543) improves image quality. In combination with a CR or a DR, GemX can be used for the inspection of steel up to 40 mm thick in compliance with NDT standards.

=== Flat panel detectors ===
- Dereo UP (ultra-portable) are Direct Radiography (DR) flat panel detectors. They provide a digital image of the objects that are radiographed. Dereo UP have a wide active area of 40 cm x 40 cm or 25 x 30 cm and a real time inspection modality to work in continuous mode as a movie camera. Their rugged conception and the fact that they doesn't require any synchronisation make them very flexible to use on the field. Their pixel of 200 μm and 140 μm offer a good compromise between sensitivity, signal-to-noise ratio (SNR) and resolution. They are controlled with Maestro NDT software. Fixed versions and high energy versions have been developed for castings applications and to be used in combination with gamma sources or linear accelerators.
- Dereo HR (high resolution) are ultra-small panels with pixels of 48 and 96 μm. The CMOS reading head and the electronic board have been separated in two modules. This offers an important compactness to the reading head. Two edges around the detective area have a width of only 3 mm of dead area. This design permits to use the panel in area with difficult access. Reading heads are interchangeable and the end-user can use the most appropriate one in function of circumstances for an optimized cost. The detector is IP65. The electronic module is battery-powered and can also control some X-ray generators wireless. Dereo HR is class-B ISO 17636-2 compliant from 1.5 to 12 mm thickness of standard steel alloys.

== See also ==
- Computed radiography
- Science Applications International Corporation (SAIC)
- Vidisco
