= Computed radiography =

Computed radiography may refer to:

- Photostimulable phosphor (PSP) plate-based radiography. This is the subject most commonly referred to by the term.
- Computed tomography, using computer processing to generate 3D-images from multiple projectional radiographs
- Digital radiography
