= Carestream Health =

American medical imaging company

- Company type: Private
- Industry: Medical and dental imaging systems; contract manufacturer/tollcoating; and non-destructive testing (NDT) products
- Founded: 2007
- Headquarters: Rochester, New York, USA
- Key people: Todd Clegg, Chairman, President and CEO
- Revenue: ▲$1.5 Billion USD (2024)
- Owner: Onex Corporation
- Number of employees: 5,000 (2020).
- Website: http://www.carestream.com/

Carestream Health, Inc., formerly Eastman Kodak Company's Health Group, is an American medical imaging company, owned by Canadian investment firm Onex Corporation.

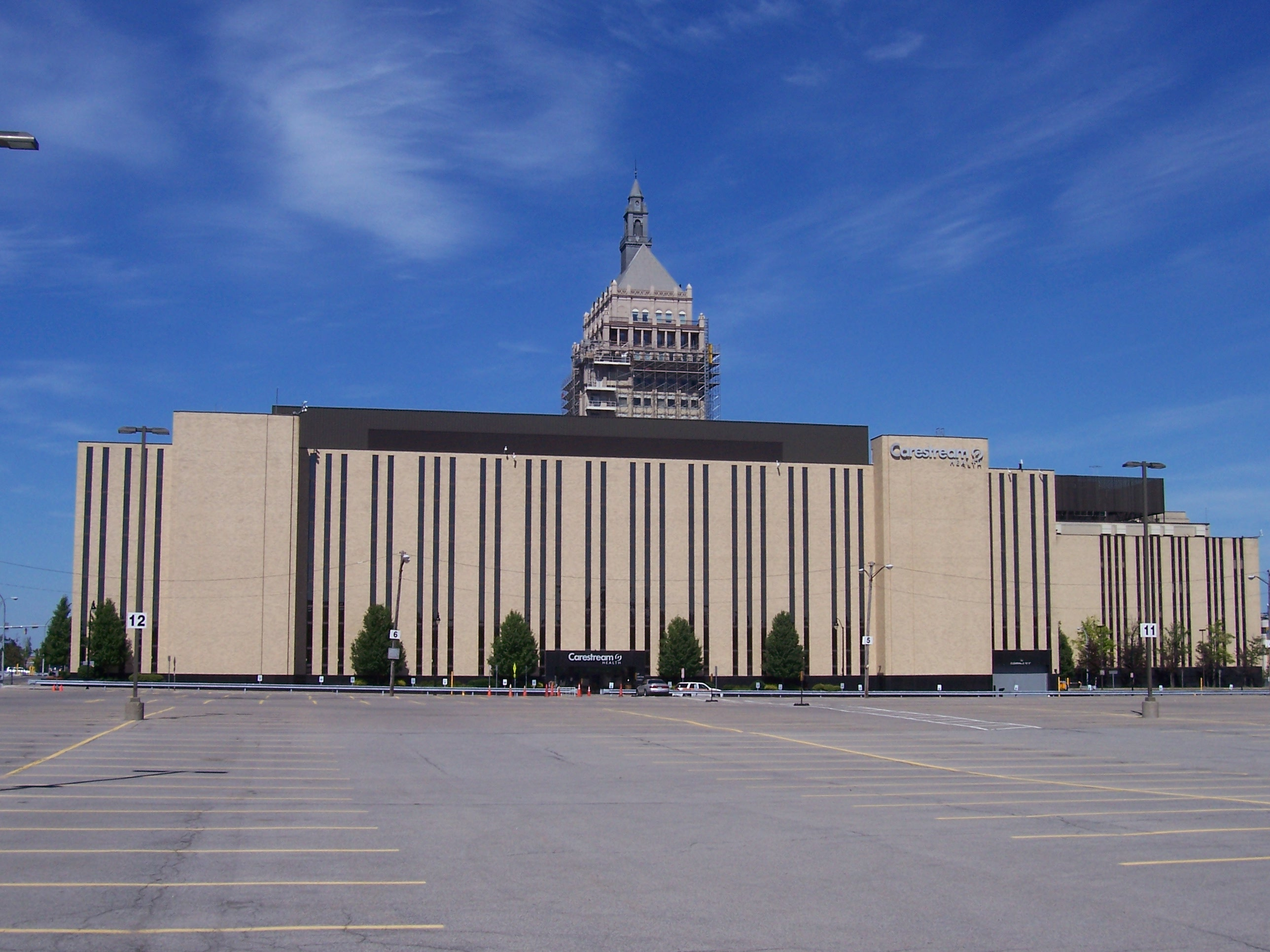
Headquarters in Rochester, New York

== History ==
In 2007, the Kodak Health Group was sold to Onex Corporation for $2.35 billion in cash. Around 8,100 employees transferred to Onex, and Kodak Health Group was renamed Carestream Health. In April 2017, Carestream Health announced an agreement to sell its Dental Digital business to private equity firms Clayton, Dubilier & Rice and the Hillhouse Capital Management group, part of CareCapital Advisors Limited. Carestream Dental provides imaging systems and practice management software for general and specialist dental practices. The dental X-ray film and anesthetics business were not included in the agreement and remain with Carestream Health.

== Products ==
Products include: photothermographic laser imagers, photothermographic imaging film, computed radiography systems, digital radiography systems, and other diagnostic imaging systems for the medical and dental imaging fields. Carestream Health owns more than 800 patents for medical and dental imaging technology. Digital imaging technologies include the DRX-1 series, which allows a wireless connection between the digital X-ray detector and computer system (whether part of their static system or a mobile/portable radiography system).

Medical and Dental Products

- Radiology department products for X-ray products and digital image processing, including: Digital radiography rooms and mobile/portable X-ray for general X-ray; Computed Radiography for general X-ray and mammography applications; and X-ray film for general and mammography applications.
- Medical printing products , including: photothermographic printers using dry film technology.

Non-Medical Products

- Contract manufacturer / Precision coating offerings, including coating; pilot coating and development; hard coating; PET manufacturing; TPU film manufacturing; solution preparation and delivery; analytical and quality testing; and converting and packaging.
- Non Destructive Testing Products, including: Computed Radiography and X-ray film.
