= Vieworks =

Vieworks Co., Ltd.
- Industry: Medical Technology, Machine Vision
- Founded: 1999
- Headquarters: Anyang, Republic of Korea
- Key people: Hooshik Kim, President and CEO
- Products: Medical Devices, Industrial Cameras
- Number of employees: 250
- Website: www.vieworks.com

Vieworks Co., Ltd. is a manufacturer of X-ray medical imaging devices and high-resolution machine vision cameras, located in Anyang, Republic of Korea. It designs, develops, manufactures and provides advanced X-ray detectors to digital imaging systems for digital radiography, digital fluoroscopy and angiography systems, industrial cameras for aerial imaging, and surveillance and AOI (automated optical inspection).

== History ==
Vieworks has developed medical and industrial imaging solutions since its establishment in 1999. It was listed on KOSDAQ (Korean Securities Dealers Automated Quotations) in 2009.

== Products ==
=== X-ray detector ===
Vieworks manufactures flat panel X-ray detectors for digital radiography and fluoroscopy.

=== Industrial Camera ===
Vieworks supplies machine vision cameras for flat panel display inspection, printed circuit board inspection, web inspection, aerial imaging, microscopy, document or film scanning, and scientific research.
