= Flat-panel detector =

Class of solid-state x-ray digital radiography devices

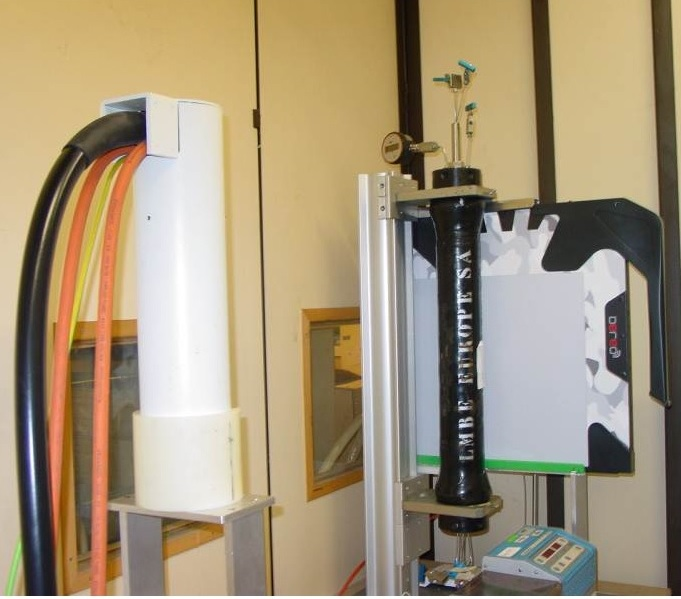
A portable aSi flat-panel detector is used to visualise the movement of liquids in sand cores under high pressure.

Flat-panel detectors are a class of solid-state x-ray digital radiography devices similar in principle to the image sensors used in digital photography and video. They are used in both projectional radiography and as an alternative to x-ray image intensifiers (IIs) in fluoroscopy equipment.

== Principles ==
Light spreading in the scintillator material leads to loss of resolution in indirect detectors which direct detectors do not experience

X-rays pass through the subject being imaged and strike one of two types of detectors.

=== Indirect detectors ===
Indirect detectors contain a layer of scintillator material, typically either gadolinium oxysulfide or cesium iodide, which converts the x-rays into light. Directly behind the scintillator layer is an amorphous silicon detector array manufactured using a process very similar to that used to make LCD televisions and computer monitors. Like a TFT-LCD, millions of roughly 0.2 mm pixels each containing a thin-film transistor form a grid patterned in amorphous silicon on the glass substrate. Unlike an LCD, but similar to a digital camera's image sensor chip, each pixel also contains a photodiode which generates an electrical signal in proportion to the light produced by the portion of scintillator layer in front of the pixel. The signals from the photodiodes are amplified and encoded by additional electronics positioned at the edges or behind the sensor array in order to produce an accurate and sensitive digital representation of the x-ray image.

=== Direct FPDs ===
Direct conversion imagers utilize photoconductors, such as amorphous selenium (a-Se), to capture and convert incident x-ray photons directly into electric charge. X-ray photons incident upon a layer of a-Se generate electron-hole pairs via the internal photoelectric effect. A bias voltage applied to the depth of the selenium layer draw the electrons and holes to corresponding electrodes; the generated current is thus proportional to the intensity of the irradiation. Signal is then read out using underlying readout electronics, typically by a thin-film transistor (TFT) array.

By eliminating the optical conversion step inherent to indirect conversion detectors, lateral spread of optical photons is eliminated, thus reducing blur in the resulting signal profile in direct conversion detectors. Coupled with the small pixel sizes achievable with TFT technology, a-Se direct conversion detectors can thus provide high spatial resolution. This high spatial resolution, coupled with a-Se's relative high quantum detection efficiency for low energy photons (< 30 keV), motivate the use of this detector configuration for mammography, in which high resolution is desirable to identify microcalcifications.

== Advantages and disadvantages ==
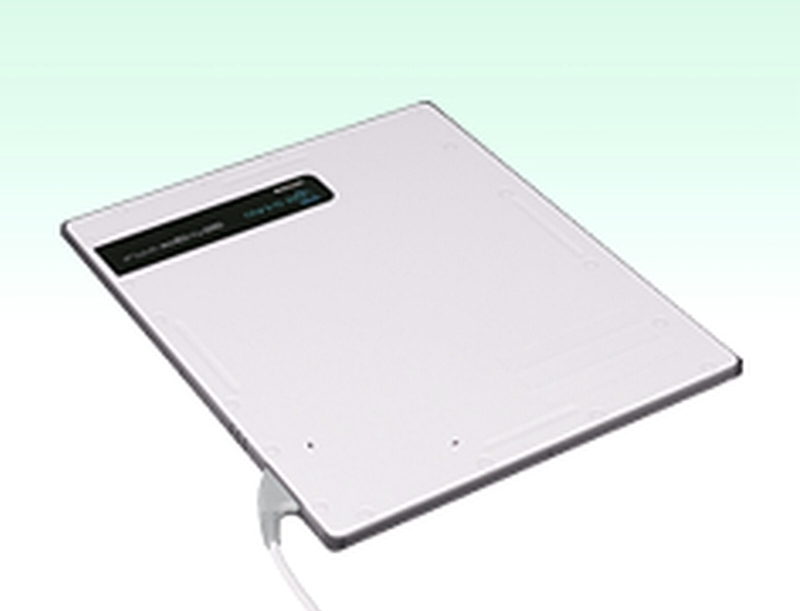
Flat-panel detector used in digital radiography

Flat-panel detectors are more sensitive and faster than film. Their sensitivity allows a lower dose of radiation for a given picture quality than film. For fluoroscopy, they are lighter, far more durable, smaller in volume, more accurate, and have much less image distortion than x-ray image intensifiers and can also be produced with larger areas. Disadvantages compared to IIs can include defective image elements, higher costs and lower spatial resolution.

In general radiography, there are time and cost savings to be made over computed radiography and (especially) film systems. In the United States, digital radiography is on course to surpass use of computed radiography and film.

In mammography, direct conversion FPDs have been shown to outperform film and indirect technologies in terms of resolution, signal-to-noise ratio, and quantum efficiency. Digital mammography is commonly recommended as the minimum standard for breast screening programmes.

== See also ==
- X-ray detectors
