= Neptunium sulfides =

Compounds of neptunium and sulfur

Neptunium sulfides are compounds of neptunium and sulfur. In these compounds, neptunium has an oxidation state of +3 or +4, and sulfur exists as sulfide or polysulfide ions. They have the general formula Np_{x}S_{y}. Known neptunium sulfides include NpS, Np_{3}S_{4}, Np_{2}S_{3}, Np_{3}S_{5}, NpS_{2}, Np_{2}S_{5}, and NpS_{3}. These compounds are often isostructural with their corresponding uranium or plutonium compounds. Neptunium oxysulfides (mixed oxide-sulfides) are also known, including Np_{2}O_{2}S, Np_{4}O_{4}S_{3}, and NpOS.

== Neptunium(III) sulfides ==
=== Neptunium monosulfide ===
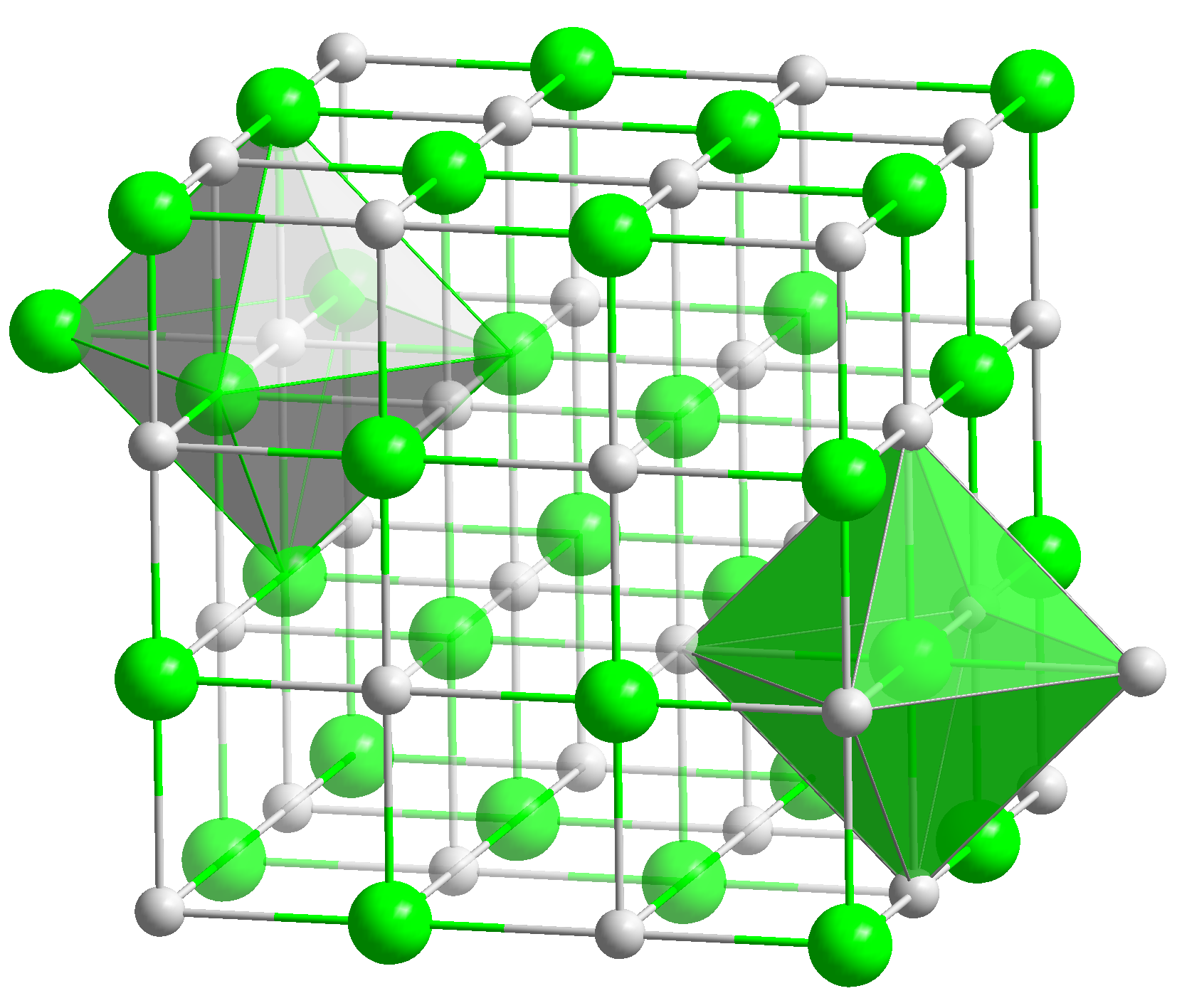
Structure of neptunium monosulfide.

Neptunium monosulfide has the formula NpS. It features neptunium in the +3 state, being an electride salt like plutonium monosulfide. Like plutonium monosulfide, it adopts a rock salt structure, with lattice constant a=5.532 Å.

It can be produced by reducing Np_{2}S_{3} with neptunium metal at 1600 °C:

Np_{2}S_{3} + Np → 3 NpS

It can also be produced by reacting neptunium metal with sulfur gas:

Np + S → NpS

It behaves as a resistor, with an electrical resistivity of 60,000 μΩ⋅cm.

It is predicted to undergo a phase transition to a caesium chloride-type structure at 75 GPa, with a 3.7% volume loss from the NaCl-type structure.

=== Neptunium sesquisulfide ===
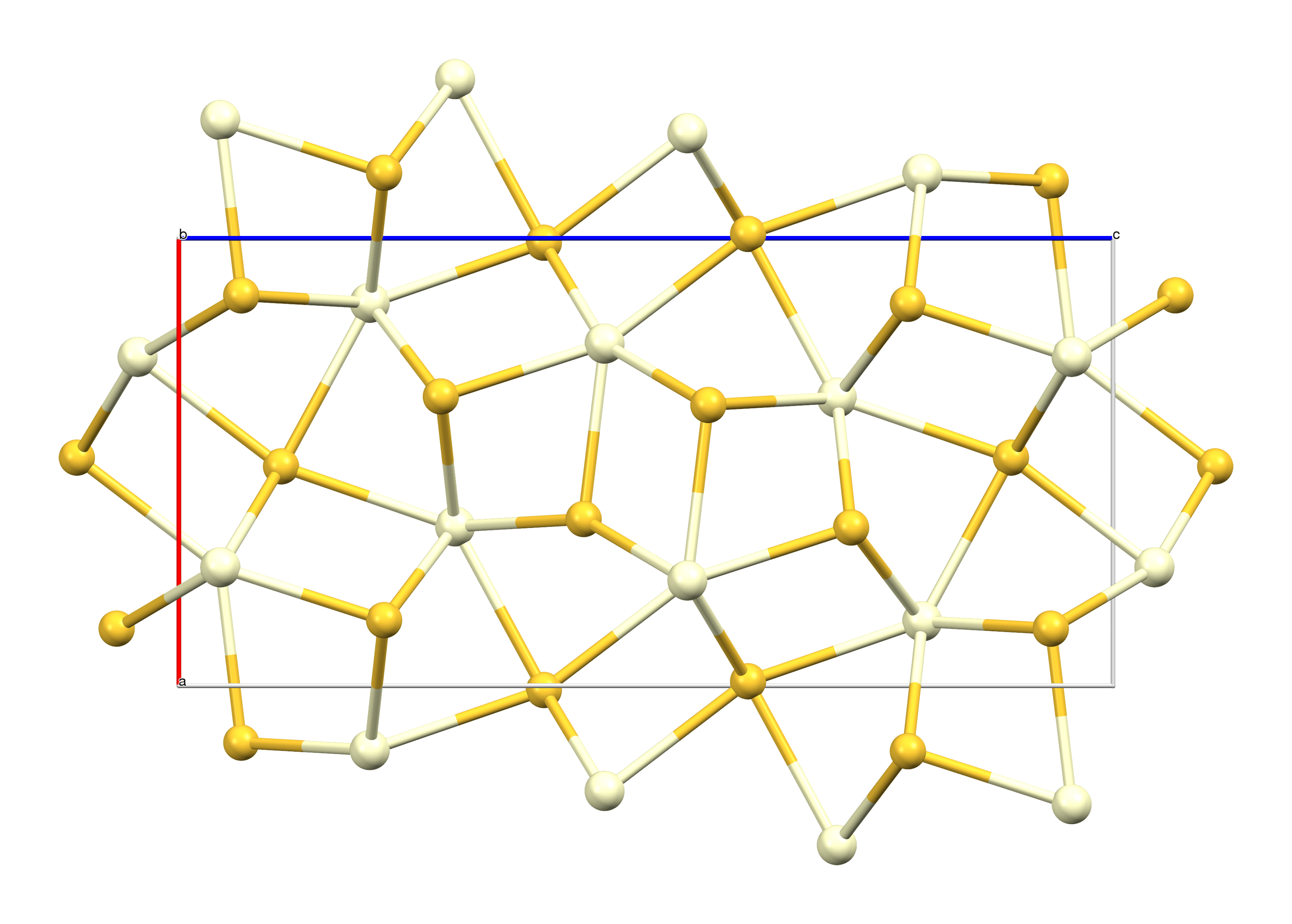
Structure of α-Np_{2}S_{3}.

Neptunium sesquisulfide has the formula Np_{2}S_{3}. It has several polymorphs, which are isostructural with the corresponding plutonium sulfides. It is often hypostoichiometric, with compositions ranging between Np_{3}S_{4}, Np_{5}S_{7}, and Np_{2}S_{3}.

It was first prepared by reacting neptunium dioxide with carbon disulfide and hydrogen sulfide in 1948. It can also be prepared via thermal composition of Np_{3}S_{5} at ~1200 K in vacuum:

2 Np_{3}S_{5} → 3 Np_{2}S_{3} + S

Np_{2}S_{3} was initially reported to be isostructural with uranium sesquisulfide (dubbed η-Np_{2}S_{3}) with lattice parameters a=10.3, b=10.6, and c=3.9 Å. However, later experiments could not reproduce these results.

Later experiments found evidence for three polymorphs of Np_{2}S_{3}: α-, β-, and γ-Np_{2}S_{3}. These are isostructural with the corresponding plutonium compounds.

α-Np_{2}S_{3} is the form of Np_{2}S_{3} present at standard temperature. It has an α-Ce_{2}S_{3}-type structure. Unlike β-Np_{2}S_{3} and γ-Np_{2}S_{3}, it is stoichiometric. It is orthorhombic with lattice parameters a=3.98, b=7.39, and c=15.50 Å.

β-Np_{2}S_{3} can be formed from heating α-Np_{2}S_{3} to around ~1500 K. It has a β-Ce_{2}S_{3}-type structure, being tetragonal with lattice parameters a=14.94, b=7.39, and c=19.84 Å. It has a stoichiometry between Np_{5}S_{7} and Np_{2}S_{3-ε}.

γ-Np_{2}S_{3} can be formed from heating β-Np_{2}S_{3} to around ~1800 K. It adopts the cubic Th_{3}P_{4}-type structure, being cubic with lattice parameter a=8.440 Å. It has a stoichiometry between Np_{3}S_{4} and Np_{2}S_{3-ε}.

== Neptunium(III,IV) sulfides ==
=== Trineptunium pentasulfide ===
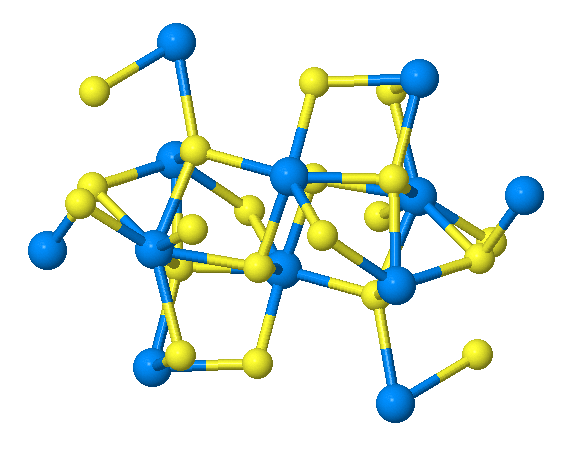
Structure of trineptunium pentasulfide.

Trineptunium pentasulfide has the formula Np_{3}S_{5}. Like the corresponding neptunium selenide, Np_{3}Se_{5}, it is antiferromagnetic, undergoing magnetic ordering at 35 K. It is a black solid which is isostructural with triuranium pentasulfide.

It can be obtained by the thermal decomposition of neptunium trisulfide at 500 °C or by reacting neptunium and sulfur in caesium chloride flux.

It decomposes into α-Np_{2}S_{3} at 900 °C. At normal temperatures, however, it is highly stable, and is a common byproduct of reactions involving compounds of neptunium and sulfur.

It contains Np^{III} and Np^{IV} ions in a 2:1 ratio, and its formula can be represented as (Np^{3+})_{2}(Np^{4+})(S^{2−})_{5}.

== Neptunium(IV) sulfides ==
=== Neptunium disulfide ===
Neptunium disulfide has the formula NpS_{2}. Very little information about it is available, and it is difficult to synthesize. Mössbauer spectroscopy indicates that it contains Np^{IV}.

=== Dineptunium pentasulfide ===
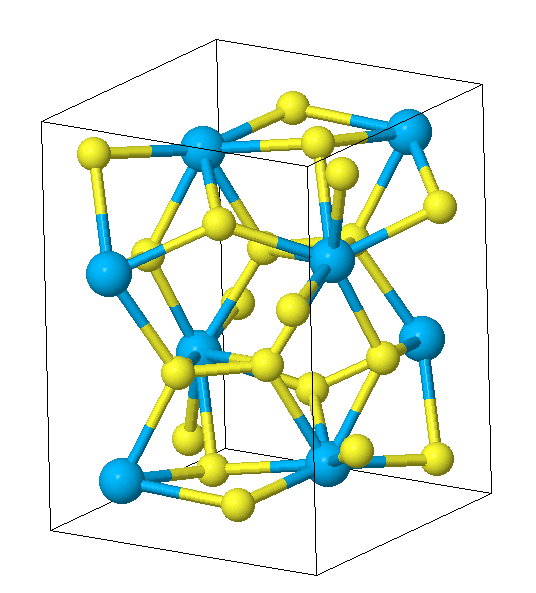
Structure of dineptunium pentasulfide.

Dineptunium pentasulfide has the formula Np_{2}S_{5}. It is isostructural with the corresponding thorium sulfide (Th_{2}S_{5}) and uranium sulfide (U_{2}S_{5}). It is a polysulfide, and its formula can be represented as (Np^{4+})_{2}(S^{2−})_{3}(S^{2−}_{2}). It forms tetragonal crystals, with lattice parameters a=10.48 and c=9.84 Å. It can be synthesized by reacting Np_{3}S_{5} with sulfur at 500 °C:

2 Np_{3}S_{5} + 5 S → 3 Np_{2}S_{5}

=== Neptunium trisulfide ===
Neptunium trisulfide has the formula NpS_{3}. It has been found to undergo magnetic ordering at low temperatures (~45 K). It is a polysulfide, and its formula can be represented as (Np^{4+})(S^{2−})(S^{2−}_{2}).

It can be formed via the reaction of neptunium and sulfur at 500 °C:

Np + 3 S → NpS_{3}

It has a monoclinic structure, isostructural with US_{3}, with lattice parameters a=5.36, b=3.87, c=18.10 Å, and β=99°.

== Neptunium oxysulfides ==
=== Np_{2}O_{2}S ===
Dineptunium dioxide monosulfide (Np_{2}O_{2}S) is the only stable oxysulfide of neptunium at high temperatures (~1600 °C). It is isostructural with other lanthanide and actinide oxysulfides, like La_{2}O_{2}S, having a hexagonal crystal structure with lattice parameters a=3.95 and c=6.80 Å. It is formed by the high temperature decomposition of Np_{4}O_{4}S_{3}. It contains Np^{III}.

=== Np_{4}O_{4}S_{3} ===
Tetraneptunium tetroxide trisulfide (Np_{4}O_{4}S_{3}) is formed from the decomposition of NpOS in vacuum at 700 °C. It is isostructural with Pu_{4}O_{4}S_{3}, having a pseudo-hexagonal structure with lattice parameters a=4.07, b=6.76, c=3.89 Å, and β=118°. It contains Np^{III} and Np^{IV} in equal amounts. Its formula can be written as (Np^{3+})_{2}(Np^{4+})_{2}(O^{2−})_{4}(S^{2−})_{3}.

=== NpOS ===
Neptunium monoxide monosulfide (NpOS) is commonly encountered as a result of oxidation of other neptunium sulfides, e.g. Np_{3}S_{5}. Pure NpOS can be formed by oxidizing NpS in a sealed ampoule at 700 °C:

2 NpS + O_{2} → 2 NpOS

It is isostructural with the corresponding uranium oxysulfide and plutonium oxysulfide, forming tetragonal crystals with lattice parameters a=3.815 and c=6.623 Å. It contains Np^{IV}.
