= Lithium hexafluorogermanate =

Names
- IUPAC name Lithium hexafluorogermanate
- Other names Lithium germanium fluoride

Identifiers
CAS Number	16903-41-6
3D model (JSmol)	Interactive image; Interactive image
PubChem CID	16700594
CompTox Dashboard (EPA)	DTXSID001337284
- InChI: InChI=1S/F6Ge.2Li/c1-7(2,3,4,5)6;;/q-2;2*+1; Key: CRAVKAIWEHPLQK-UHFFFAOYSA-N
- SMILES: [Li+].[Li+].F[Ge-2](F)(F)(F)(F)F; [Li+].[Li+].F[Ge-2](F)(F)(F)(F)F

Properties
Chemical formula	Li_{2}GeF_{6}
Molar mass	200.51 g/mol
Appearance	white solid
Melting point	510 °C (950 °F; 783 K)
Solubility in water	53.9 g / 100 g water (25°C)

Hazards
NFPA 704 (fire diamond)	2 0 0
Safety data sheet (SDS)	External MSDS

Related compounds
Related compounds	Gadolinium oxysulfide
- Except where otherwise noted, data are given for materials in their standard state (at 25 °C [77 °F], 100 kPa). Infobox references

Lithium hexafluorogermanate is the inorganic compound with the formula Li_{2}GeF_{6}. It forms a solid off-white deliquescent powder. When exposed to moisture, it easily hydrolyses to release hydrogen fluoride and germanium tetrafluoride gases.

== Reactions and applications ==
Lithium hexafluorogermanate can be dissolved in a solution of hydrogen fluoride, which forms a precipitate of lithium fluoride.

It can be used as a densification aid in the sintering of gadolinium oxysulfide, and as a lithium salt additive in a lithium-ion battery electrolyte.
