= Vidisco =

Vidisco Ltd.
- Type: Private company (Ltd.)
- Industry: Manufacturing, defense (military), non-destructive testing
- Founded: 1988
- Founder: Shlomo Shapira
- Headquarters: Or Yehuda, Israel
- Key people: Alon Guttel (CEO); Alon Flieder (VP R&D)
- Products: Digital X-ray, X-ray generator, Digital radiography
- Number of employees: 40 (2011)

Vidisco is an Israeli based developer and manufacturer of portable digital X-ray inspection systems.

The company was founded in 1988 by Shlomo Shapira, to develop digital portable X-ray inspection of unexploded ordnance, the company has since developed a range of digital X-ray inspection devices for both the security and industrial testing markets. Vidisco was one of the first companies to integrate amorphous silicon flat panels into portable X-ray systems.

According to the company, it supplies portable digital radiography inspection systems to a number of security and military agencies around the world, including the Israel Defense Forces, Ministry of Defence (United Kingdom), and United States Armed Forces. As of January 2019 Vidisco's CEO is Alon Guttel.

== Products and technologies ==
Vidisco develops digital X-ray products, marketed for inspection and security duties including bomb detection and disposal, personnel security and protection, searches for drug and contraband smuggling, customs offices and forensics. A second market sector is aimed at applications in Nondestructive testing (NDT) such as pipe inspections in refineries and the petrochemical industry, composite material testing in the aerospace industry as well as inspection of welding in shipyards and art and archeological artifacts.

=== Security products ===
FoXrayIIe CCD based portable digital X-ray system
Guardian Rugged Digital Flat Panel based systems
XR-DE Dual Energy Module for Pulsed X-ray Sources
Robot Ready Integration
Wireless Accessories (Digital Wireless and Wireless X-ray)
VEO proprietary Software

=== Non-destructive testing (NDT) products ===
VIDI Thinnest Digital DDA Imager based systems
Wireless Accessories (Digital Wireless and Wireless X-ray)
XbitPro proprietary Software

=== Key technologies ===
10 bit CCD Based Portable X-ray Systems
Amorphous Silicon (a-Si) Digital Detector Array (DDA)
Imager Control Unit (CAT) with built-in Wireless Communications
Portable amorphous Silicon (a-Si) Flat Panel Technology
Portable Digital Radiography PC based X-ray Inspection Systems
Portable Dual Energy X-ray module for Pulsed X-ray Sources – XR-DE
XbitPro proprietary Software
(Dual Energy) Organic Detection X-ray imaging Technology

== History timeline ==
- 1986 Vidisco is founded by Shlomo Shapira, Ari Diamond and Lior Pick to design and manufacture integrated computerized video systems.
- 1988 The first portable digital X-ray inspection designed by Shapira and his team are released.
- 1988–1993 First Video-based portable X-ray systems – A400, A500 & A500E.
- 1992 David Singer is appointed the first International Marketing Manager.
- 1994 Ships the first portable X-ray inspection system packed in a single case.
- 1995–1998 Develops remote control of the X-ray source and digital radiography PC based inspection system that allows bomb technicians to work a safe distance from the inspection area. Develops and ships first CCD (Charge-Coupled Device)-based digital radiology system with 8 bit X-ray image capabilities – the FoXrayII.
- 1999 Ari Diamond is nominated by Shlomo Shapira as general manager of the company, Lior Pick is promoted to Executive Vice President taking over responsibility of business development and strategy, new technology implementation, R&D and production.
- 2000 Produces CCD system in a backpack configuration.
- 2001 Incorporates amorphous Silicon flat panel technology into the radiography product line – the flat foX-17.
- 2003 Develops the foX-Rayzor 13mm digital radiology imager.
- 2004 Produces a portable Dual Energy X-ray systems that can automatically present a colored image, differentiating between organic substances (drugs or explosives shown in orange) from metallic items (which are shown in blue or green, depending on their density).
- 2005 Ships first flat panel based system in a backpack configuration (foX-Rayzor).
- 2008 Develops and ships the first portable Dual Energy X-ray module using a fixed kV portable pulsed X-ray source – the XR-DE.
- 2010 Develops new Digital Detector Array (DDA) product line with an enhanced Imager Control Unit (ICU) featuring built-in wireless communication capabilities. Adar Yiron is promoted from Operations Manager to Vice President of Sales and Marketing.
- 2011 Adds a third flat panel (DDA imager) to its product arsenal; field ready, large area, battery operated, 14 bit imager based system that fits into one case or backpack – The BlazeX and BlazeXPro.
- 2014 Ari Diamond, CEO and co-founder of the company is fired and replaced by Shai Levi.
- 2014 Shai Levi, CEO, leaves the company after 9 months.
- 2019 Alon Guttel becomes Vidisco's CEO.

== See also ==
- X-RIS
