= Plutonium oxysulfides =

Compounds of plutonium, sulfur, and oxygen

Plutonium oxysulfides are inorganic compounds of plutonium, oxygen and sulfur, where sulfur exists as sulfide (S^{2-}) or polysulfide (S_{n}^{2−}) ions and plutonium exists in the trivalent state or tetravalent state. They are mixed oxide-sulfides and include Pu_{2}O_{2}S, Pu_{4}O_{4}S_{3}, PuOS, and Pu_{2}O_{2}S_{3}.

== Compounds ==
=== Pu_{2}O_{2}S ===
Diplutonium dioxide monosulfide (Pu_{2}O_{2}S) is formed by reacting plutonium(III) oxide and plutonium sesquisulfide at 1400 °C:

2 Pu_{2}O_{3} + Pu_{2}S_{3} → 3 Pu_{2}O_{2}S

Or the decomposition of Pu_{4}O_{4}S_{3} at 1100 °C.

It is isostructural with (has the same structure as) cerium(III) oxysulfide, having a hexagonal structure with lattice parameters a=3.929 and c=6.768 Å.

=== Pu_{4}O_{4}S_{3} ===
Tetraplutonium tetroxide trisulfide (Pu_{4}O_{4}S_{3}) is formed by the decomposition of PuOS at 600 °C. It is a mixed valence compound, containing a 1:1 ratio of plutonium in its +3 and +4 oxidation states. It has a complex pseudo-hexagonal structure, with lattice parameters a=4.06, b=6.72, c=3.87 Å, and β=118°.

=== PuOS ===
Plutonium monoxide monosulfide (PuOS) is formed by reacting sulfur with Pu_{2}O_{2}S at 500 °C (though this process also creates Pu_{2}O_{2}S_{3}), or by reacting plutonium monosulfide with oxygen:

PuS + ½ O_{2} → PuOS

It is unstable, dissociating to Pu_{4}O_{4}S_{3} at 600 °C. It adopts the same structure as uranium oxysulfide, UOS, with which it forms a solid solution. Its structure is tetragonal, with lattice parameters a=3.80 and c=6.59 Å. It contains plutonium in its +4 oxidation state.

=== Pu_{2}O_{2}S_{3} ===
Diplutonium dioxide trisulfide (Pu_{2}O_{2}S_{3}) is the other product formed by reacting Pu_{2}O_{2}S with sulfur. It is a polysulfide (compound containing sulfur-sulfur bonds) with plutonium in its +4 oxidation state, and its formula can be written as (Pu^{4+})_{2}(O^{2−})_{2}S^{2−}(S^{2−}_{2}). It has a tetragonal structure with lattice parameters a=3.95 and c=7.95 Å.

== See also ==
- Neptunium sulfides
- Plutonium sulfides
