= Plutonium sulfides =

Compounds of plutonium and sulfur

Identifiers
3D model (JSmol)	PuS: Interactive image; Pu_{3}S_{4}: Interactive image; Pu_{2}S_{3}: Interactive image; PuS_{2}: Interactive image
- InChI: InChI=1S/2Pu.S2.2S/c;;1-2;;/q2*+3;3*-2 Key: NBURFVHHZADRDR-UHFFFAOYSA-N; PuS: InChI=1S/Pu.S/q+2;-2 Key: FNFJPHUBSTWEGE-UHFFFAOYSA-N; Pu_{3}S_{4}: InChI=1S/3Pu.4S/q+2;2*+3;4*-2; Pu_{2}S_{3}: InChI=1S/2Pu.3S/q2*+3;3*-2 Key: KIZOMVHRDSLQAT-UHFFFAOYSA-N; PuS_{2}: Key: KFRKDWMDESTDTC-UHFFFAOYSA-N
- SMILES: PuS: [Pu+2].[S-2]; Pu_{3}S_{4}: [Pu+2].[Pu+3].[Pu+3].[S-2].[S-2].[S-2].[S-2]; Pu_{2}S_{3}: [Pu+3].[Pu+3].[S-2].[S-2].[S-2]; PuS_{2}: [Pu+3].[Pu+3].[S-2].[S-2].[S-][S-]
- Except where otherwise noted, data are given for materials in their standard state (at 25 °C [77 °F], 100 kPa). Infobox references

Plutonium sulfides are compounds of plutonium and sulfur, where sulfur exists as sulfide or polysulfide ions and plutonium exists in the trivalent state or tetravalent state. They have a general formula Pu_{x}S_{y}. Known plutonium sulfides include PuS, Pu_{3}S_{4}, Pu_{5}S_{7}, Pu_{2}S_{3}, and PuS_{2}. Plutonium oxysulfides (mixed oxide-sulfides) are also known, including Pu_{2}O_{2}S, Pu_{4}O_{4}S_{3}, PuOS, and Pu_{2}O_{2}S_{3}. Many of them are isostructural to the corresponding neptunium sulfides.

== Plutonium monosulfide ==
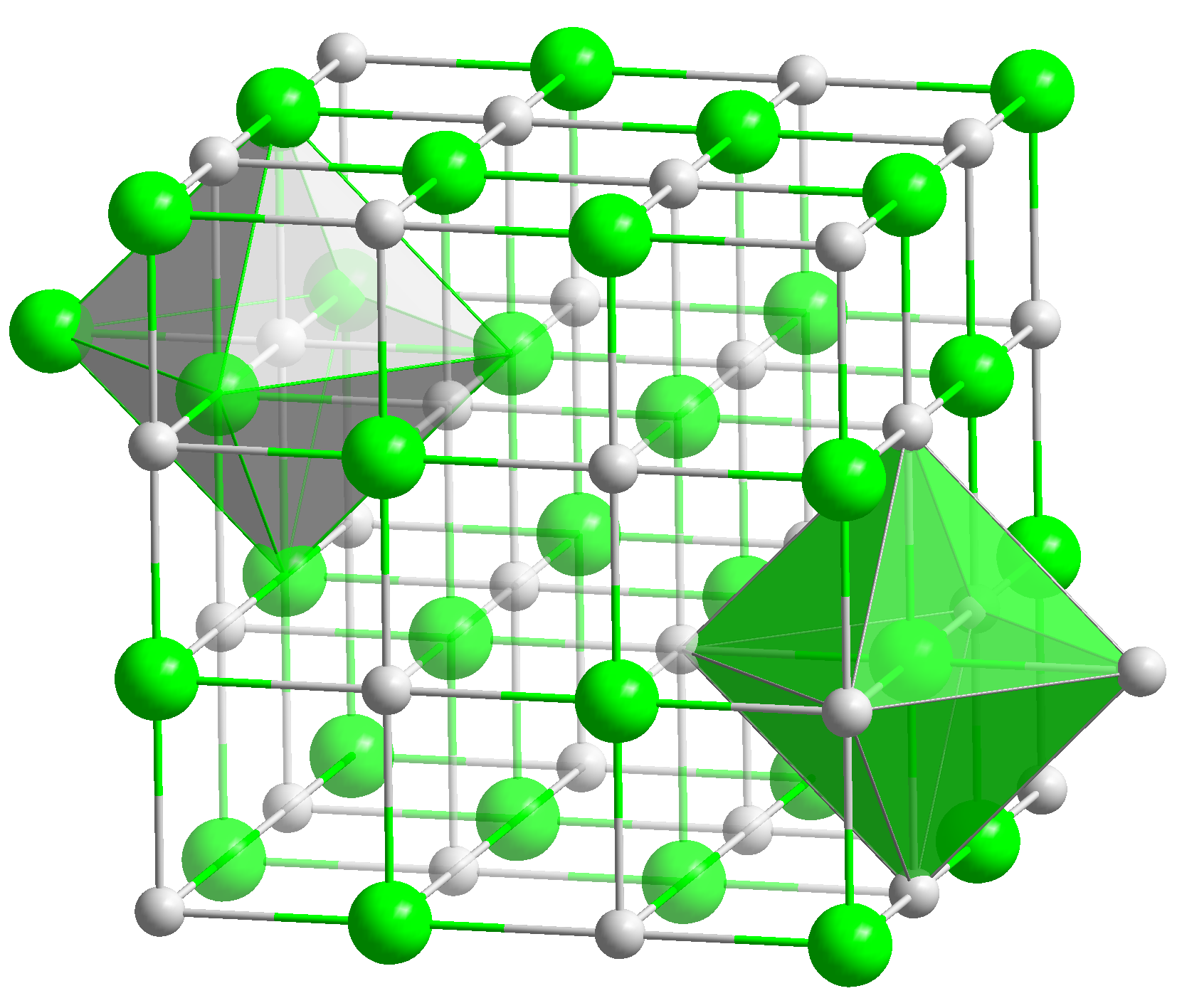
Structure of plutonium monosulfide.

Plutonium monosulfide is a yellow solid with the formula PuS. Unlike neptunium and uranium monosulfide, it contains plutonium in its tetravalent state, rather than trivalent. It is produced in several chemical reactions:

It is formed during the reaction of plutonium metal and sulfur gas:

Pu + S → PuS

It is also formed when plutonium sesquisulfide is reduced by plutonium hydride.

Reacting ground plutonium metal with hydrogen sulfide also produces plutonium monosulfide.

It is nonmagnetic, and is a semiconductor with a high electrical resistivity and a small energy gap.

It is a non-stoichiometric compound, having a range between around PuS_{0.95} and PuS_{1.00}. At Pu:S ratios lower than 0.95 or higher than 1.00, it exists in equilibrium with plutonium metal or plutonium sesquisulfide, respectively.

At room temperature and pressure, it adopts the rock salt structure. Its structure is cubic, with space group Fm3m and lattice parameter a=5.23–5.24 Å depending on stoichiometry; its lattice parameter decreases with decreasing sulfur content. It does not exhibit a phase transition up to 60 GPa, but theoretical predictions it should undergo a phase transition to a caesium chloride-type structure at 105 GPa, undergoing a 3.6% volume loss.

== Plutonium sesquisulfide ==
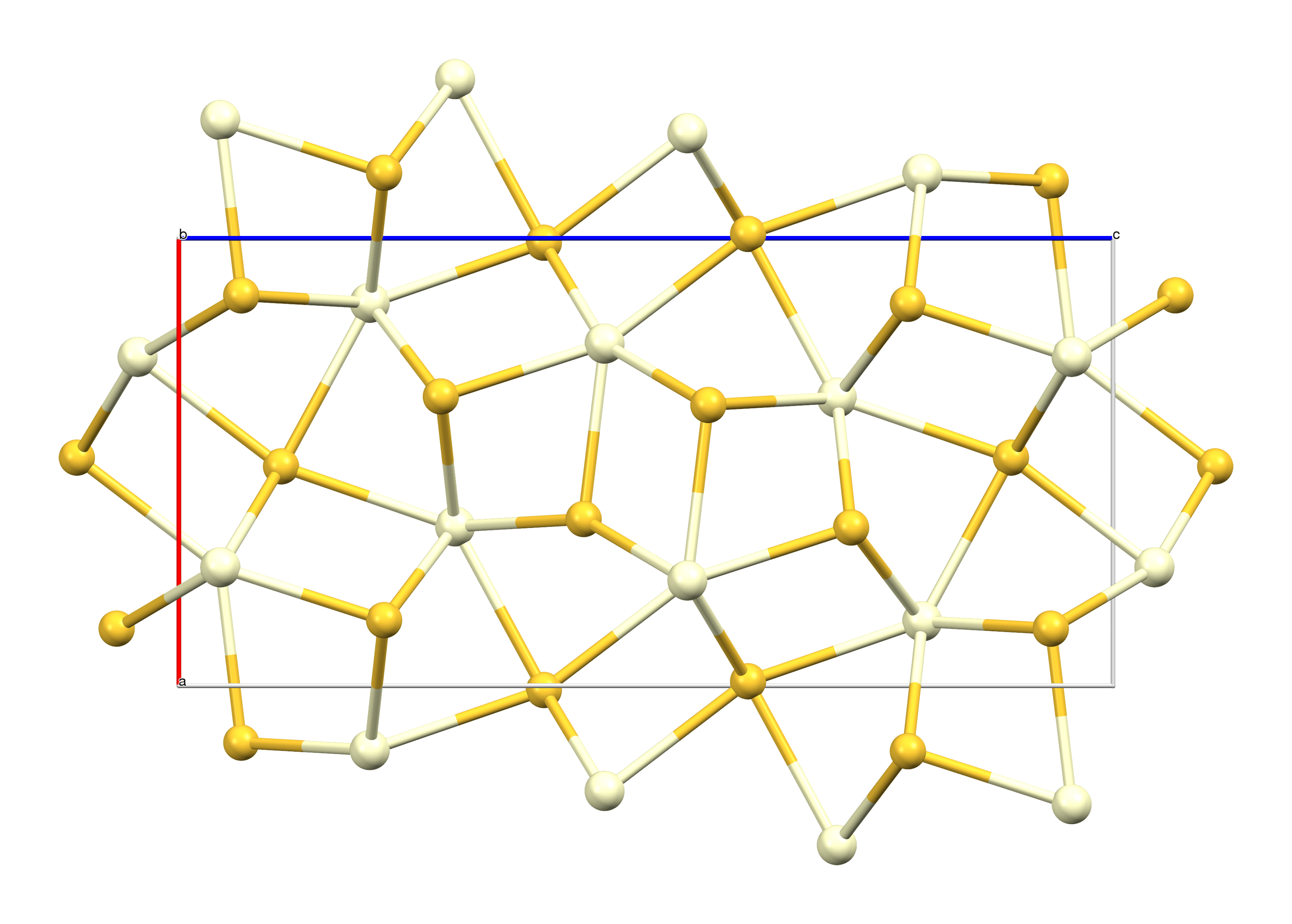
Structure of α-Pu_{2}S_{3}.

Plutonium sesquisulfide has the formula Pu_{2}S_{3}. It can be formed from the reaction between plutonium metal and sulfur gas:

2 Pu + 3 S → Pu_{2}S_{3}

Or from the thermal decomposition of plutonium disulfide:

2 PuS_{2} → Pu_{2}S_{3} + S

Three polymorphs of plutonium sesquisulfide are known: α-Pu_{2}S_{3}, β-Pu_{2}S_{3} and γ-Pu_{2}S_{3}, though β-Pu_{2}S_{3} is a ternary oxysulfide and can feature incorporated oxygen.

Like with the neptunium sulfides, α-Pu_{2}S_{3} is a stoichiometric compound, while β-Pu_{2}S_{3} and γ-Pu_{2}S_{3} have variable composition. β-Pu_{2}S_{3} is a solid solution between Pu_{10}S_{14}O and Pu_{2}S_{3} (formula Pu_{10}S_{15-x}O_{x}) and γ-Pu_{2}S_{3} is substoichiometric with an ideal composition of Pu_{3}S_{4}.

α-Pu_{2}S_{3} is the dominant form of Pu_{2}S_{3} up to 1100 °C. At 1100 °C, it decomposes to the β-Pu_{2}S_{3}, and at 1550 °C, β-Pu_{2}S_{3} decomposes to γ-Pu_{2}S_{3}. γ-Pu_{2}S_{3} melts above 1700 °C; however, its melting point is dependent on its stoichiometry. Pu_{2}S_{3} melts around 1725 °C, but Pu_{3}S_{4} melts around 1820 °C.

=== Structural properties ===
α-Pu_{2}S_{3} has the same structure as the related rare earth compounds, having the La_{2}S_{3}-type structure, isostructural with α-Np_{2}S_{3} and α-Ce_{2}S_{3}. It features a framework of PuS_{7} and PuS_{8} polyhedra. Its crystals are orthorhombic, with lattice parameters a=3.97, b=7.37, and c=15.45 Å. It has a density of 8.31 g/cm^{3} and space group Pnma.

While early reports suggested β-Pu_{2}S_{3} was a binary substoichiometric sulfide, it was later shown that the rare earth sesquisulfide phases, including β-Pu_{2}S_{3}, actually contain variable amounts of oxygen as opposed to sulfur vacancies, and it is now known to have variable composition between Pu_{2}S_{3} and Pu_{10}S_{14}O, with a single site where oxygen and sulfur substitute for each other. It adopts a complex tetragonal structure of space group I4_{1}/acd which notably contains a Pu_{4}O tetrahedron. One crystal of this compound was found to have lattice parameters a=14.90, b=19.78 Å.

γ-Pu_{2}S_{3} adopts a Th_{3}P_{4}-type structure of space group I4̅3d and bcc symmetry, where each plutonium atom is coordinated to 8 atoms of sulfur. It extends over a large range of stoichiometries, from Pu_{3}S_{4} to Pu_{2}S_{3}. Its lattice parameter is dependent on its stoichiometry; Pu_{3}S_{4} has lattice parameter around a=8.415 Å, while Pu_{2}S_{3} has lattice parameter a=8.453–8.459 Å, though this depends on the exact conditions.

== Plutonium disulfide ==
Plutonium disulfide has the formula PuS_{2}. It is the highest sulfide of plutonium. It is formed by the reaction of plutonium hydride and sulfur in a sealed tube for one week at about 350 °C to 750 °C, or by reacting plutonium and sulfur vapor together:

Pu + 2S → PuS_{2}

It adopts an anti-Fe_{2}As type structure, with distortions that arise from disulfide bonding between sulfur atoms. It is often substoichiometric, and its composition range extends from PuS_{2.0} to around PuS_{1.76}. Its structure can be either tetragonal (space group P4/nmm) or monoclinic (space group P2_{1}/a), though the monoclinic phase can only be found at the exact composition PuS_{2}. Its lattice parameters vary depending on sulfur content; PuS_{1.76} has lattice parameters a=3.936 and c=7.958 Å, PuS_{1.9} has lattice parameters a=3.943 and c=7.962 Å, and tetragonal PuS_{2.0} has lattice parameters a=3.974 and c=7.947 Å. The monoclinic PuS_{2.0} phase has lattice parameters a=7.962, b=3.981, c=7.962 Å, and β=90°.

Plutonium disulfide is thermally unstable, and upon calcination, it decomposes to lower plutonium sulfides. PuS_{2} first loses sulfur at 500 °C to give PuS_{1.9}, which further loses sulfur at 580 °C to give α-Pu_{2}S_{3}.

== See also ==
- Neptunium sulfides
- Plutonium oxysulfides
