= X-ray detector =

Instrument that can measure properties of X-rays

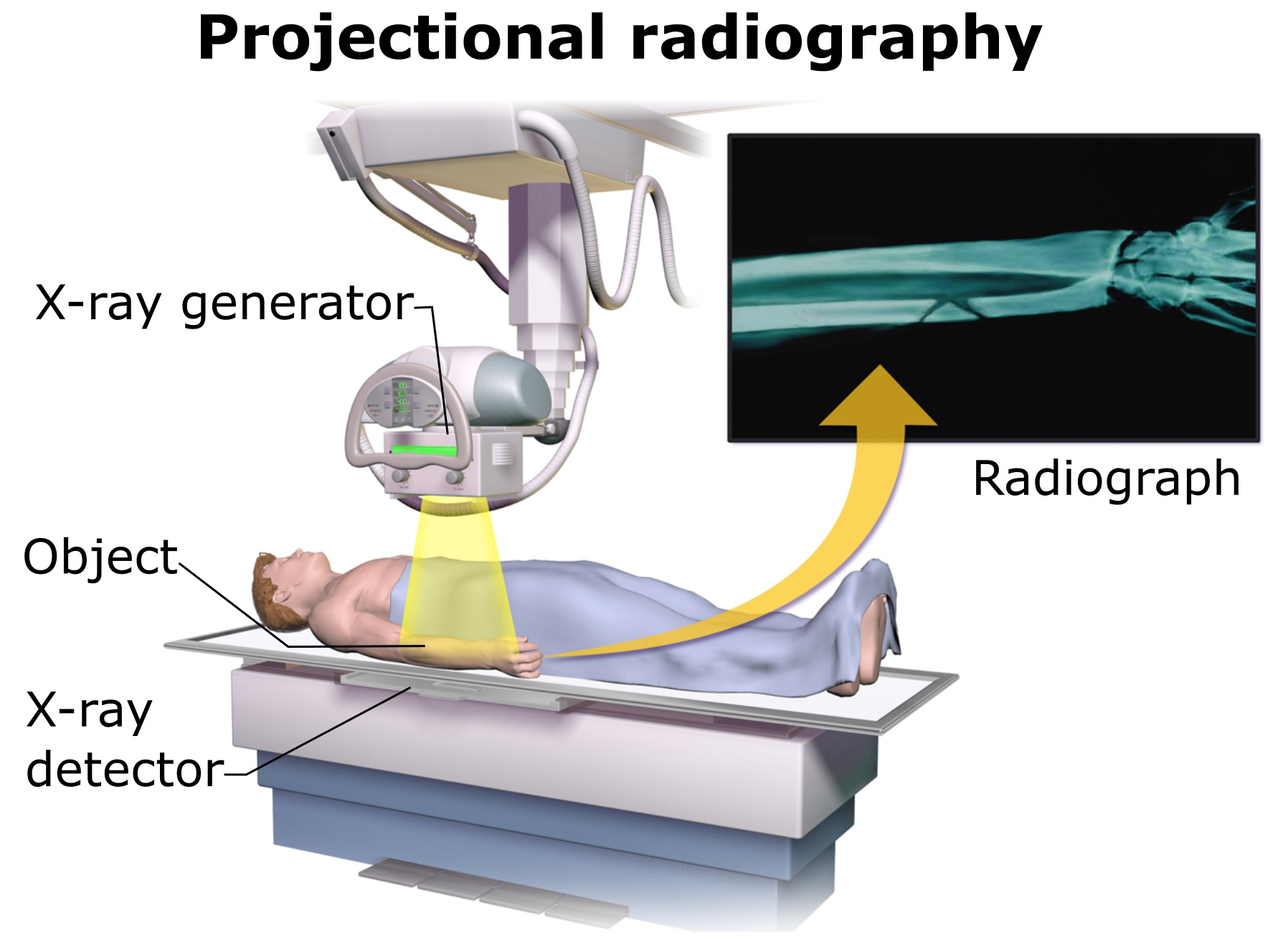
Acquisition of projectional radiography, with an X-ray generator and an imaging detector.

X-ray detectors are devices used to measure the flux, spatial distribution, spectrum, and/or other properties of X-rays.

Detectors can be divided into two major categories: imaging detectors (such as photographic plates and X-ray film (photographic film), now mostly replaced by various digitizing devices like image plates or flat panel detectors) and dose measurement devices (such as ionization chambers, Geiger counters, and dosimeters used to measure the local radiation exposure, dose, and/or dose rate, for example, for verifying that radiation protection equipment and procedures are effective on an ongoing basis).

== X-ray imaging ==
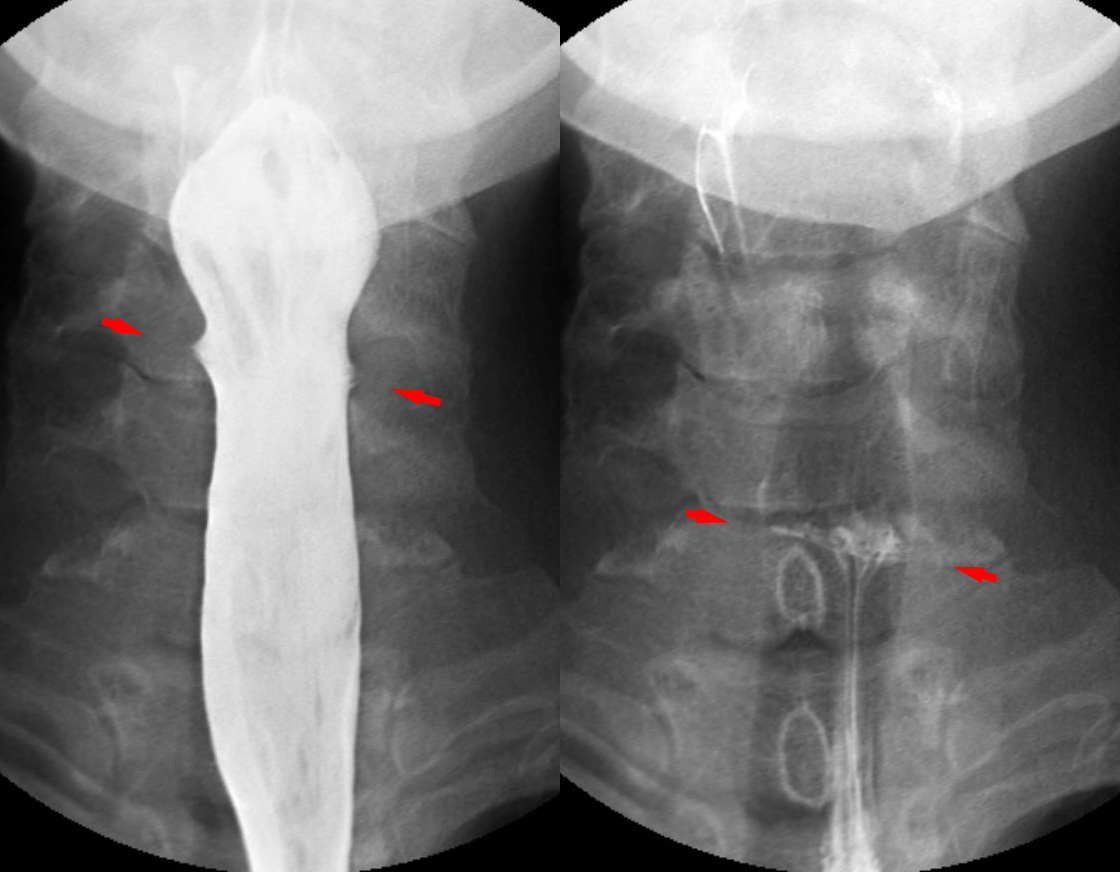
Fish bone pierced in the upper esophagus. Right image without contrast medium, left image during swallowing with contrast medium.

To obtain an image with any type of image detector the part of the patient to be X-rayed is placed between the X-ray source and the image receptor to produce a shadow of the internal structure of that particular part of the body. X-rays are partially blocked ("attenuated") by dense tissues such as bone, and pass more easily through soft tissues. Areas where the X-rays strike darken when developed, causing bones to appear lighter than the surrounding soft tissue.

Contrast compounds containing barium or iodine, which are radiopaque, can be ingested in the gastrointestinal tract (barium) or injected in the artery or veins to highlight these vessels. The contrast compounds have high atomic numbered elements in them that (like bone) essentially block the X-rays and hence the once hollow organ or vessel can be more readily seen. In the pursuit of nontoxic contrast materials, many types of high atomic number elements were evaluated. Some elements chosen proved to be harmful – for example, thorium was once used as a contrast medium (Thorotrast) – which turned out to be toxic, causing a very high incidence of cancer decades after use. Modern contrast material has improved and, while there is no way to determine who may have a sensitivity to the contrast, the incidence of serious allergic reactions is low.

=== X-ray film ===
==== Mechanism ====
Typical x-ray film contains silver halide crystal "grains", typically primarily silver bromide. Grain size and composition can be adjusted to affect the film properties, for example to improve resolution in the developed image. When the film is exposed to radiation the halide is ionised and free electrons are trapped in crystal defects (forming a latent image). Silver ions are attracted to these defects and reduced, creating clusters of transparent silver atoms. In the developing process these are converted to opaque silver atoms which form the viewable image, darkest where the most radiation was detected. Further developing steps stabilise the sensitised grains and remove unsensitised grains to prevent further exposure (e.g. from visible light).

==== Replacement ====
A video discussing a study that showed that digital x-rays were equally effective in identifying occupational lung diseases as film x-rays.

The first radiographs (X-ray images) were made by the action of X-rays on sensitized glass photographic plates. X-ray film (photographic film) soon replaced the glass plates, and film has been used for decades to acquire (and display) medical and industrial images. Gradually, digital computers gained the ability to store and display enough data to make digital imaging possible. Since the 1990s, computerized radiography and digital radiography have been replacing photographic film in medical and dental applications, though film technology remains in widespread use in industrial radiography processes (e.g. to inspect welded seams). The metal silver (formerly necessary to the radiographic & photographic industries) is a non-renewable resource although silver can easily be reclaimed from spent X-ray film. Where X-ray films required wet processing facilities, newer digital technologies do not. Digital archiving of images also saves physical storage space.

=== Photostimulable phosphors ===
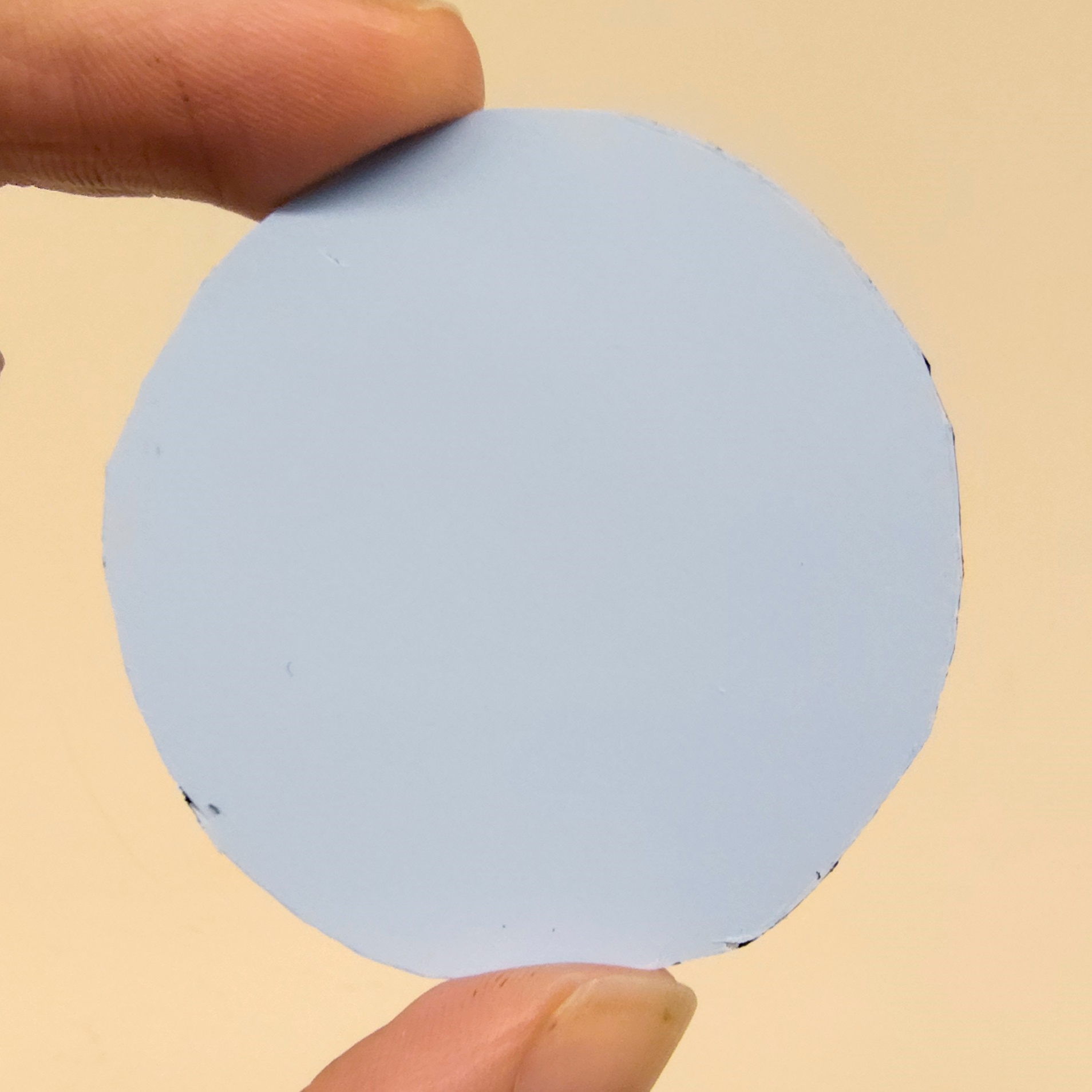
A piece of photostimulable phosphor plate

Phosphor plate radiography is a method of recording X-rays using photostimulated luminescence (PSL), pioneered by Fuji in the 1980s. A photostimulable phosphor plate (PSP) is used in place of the photographic plate. After the plate is X-rayed, excited electrons in the phosphor material remain 'trapped' in 'colour centres' in the crystal lattice until stimulated by a laser beam passed over the plate surface. The light given off during laser stimulation is collected by a photomultiplier tube, and the resulting signal is converted into a digital image by computer technology. The PSP plate can be reused, and existing X-ray equipment requires no modification to use them. The technique may also be known as computed radiography (CR).

=== Image intensifiers ===
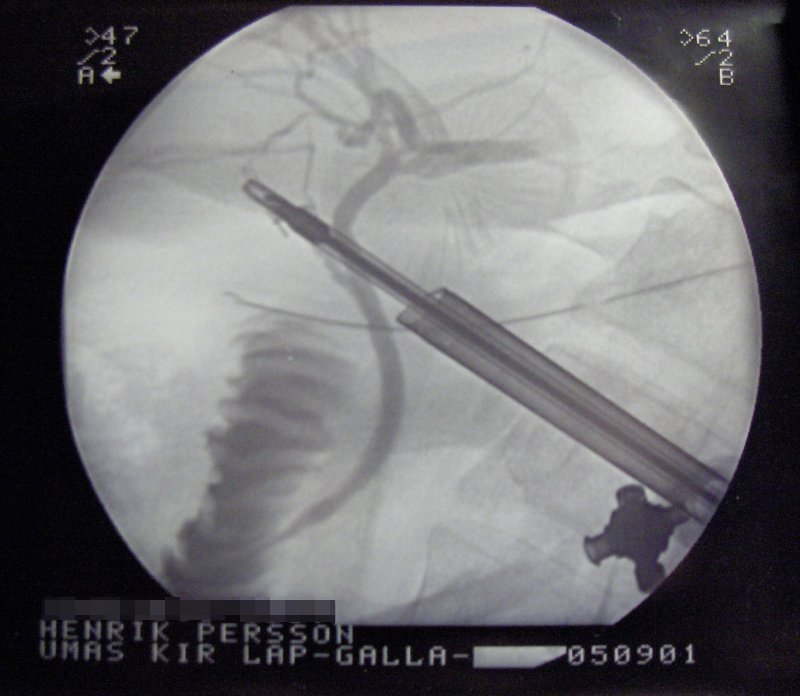
Radiograph taken during cholecystectomy

X-rays are also used in "real-time" procedures such as angiography or contrast studies of the hollow organs (e.g. barium enema of the small or large intestine) using fluoroscopy. Angioplasty, medical interventions of the arterial system, rely heavily on X-ray-sensitive contrast to identify potentially treatable lesions.

=== Semiconductor detectors ===
Solid state detectors use semiconductors to detect x-rays. Direct digital detectors are so-called because they directly convert x-ray photons to electrical charge and thus a digital image. Indirect systems may have intervening steps for example first converting x-ray photons to visible light, and then an electronic signal. Both systems typically use thin film transistors to read out and convert the electronic signal to a digital image. Unlike film or CR no manual scanning or development step is required to obtain a digital image, and so in this sense both systems are "direct". Both types of system have considerably higher quantum efficiency than CR.

==== Direct detectors ====
Since the 1970s, silicon or germanium doped with lithium (Si(Li) or Ge(Li)) semiconductor detectors have been developed. X-ray photons are converted to electron-hole pairs in the semiconductor and are collected to detect the X-rays. When the temperature is low enough (the detector is cooled by Peltier effect or even cooler liquid nitrogen), it is possible to directly determine the X-ray energy spectrum; this method is called energy-dispersive X-ray spectroscopy (EDX or EDS); it is often used in small X-ray fluorescence spectrometers. Silicon drift detectors (SDDs), produced by conventional semiconductor fabrication, provide a cost-effective and high resolving power radiation measurement. Unlike conventional X-ray detectors, such as Si(Li), they do not need to be cooled with liquid nitrogen. These detectors are rarely used for imaging and are only efficient at low energies.

Practical application in medical imaging started in the early 2000s. Amorphous selenium is used in commercial large area flat panel X-ray detectors for mammography and general radiography due to its high spatial resolution and x-ray absorbing properties. However Selenium's low atomic number means a thick layer is required to achieve sufficient sensitivity.

Cadmium telluride (CdTe), and its alloy with zinc, cadmium zinc telluride, is considered one of the most promising semiconductor materials for x-ray detection due to its wide band-gap and high quantum number resulting in room temperature operation with high efficiency. Current applications include bone densitometry and SPECT but flat panel detectors suitable for radiographic imaging are not yet in production. Current research and development is focused around energy resolving pixel detectors, such as CERN's Medipix detector and Science and Technology Facilities Council's HEXITEC detector.

Common semiconductor diodes, such as PIN photodiodes or a 1N4007, will produce a small amount of current in photovoltaic mode when placed in an X-ray beam.

==== Indirect detectors ====
Indirect detectors are made up of a scintillator to convert x-rays to visible light, which is read by a TFT array. This can provide sensitivity advantages over current (amorphous selenium) direct detectors, albeit with a potential trade-off in resolution. Indirect flat panel detectors (FPDs) are in widespread use today in medical, dental, veterinary, and industrial applications.

The TFT array consists of a sheet of glass covered with a thin layer of silicon that is in an amorphous or disordered state. At a microscopic scale, the silicon has been imprinted with millions of transistors arranged in a highly ordered array, like the grid on a sheet of graph paper. Each of these thin-film transistors (TFTs) is attached to a light-absorbing photodiode making up an individual pixel (picture element). Photons striking the photodiode are converted into two carriers of electrical charge, called electron-hole pairs. Since the number of charge carriers produced will vary with the intensity of incoming light photons, an electrical pattern is created that can be swiftly converted to a voltage and then a digital signal, which is interpreted by a computer to produce a digital image. Although silicon has outstanding electronic properties, it is not a particularly good absorber of X-ray photons. For this reason, X-rays first impinge upon scintillators made from such materials as gadolinium oxysulfide or caesium iodide. The scintillator absorbs the X-rays and converts them into visible light photons that then pass onto the photodiode array.

== Dose measurement ==
=== Gas detectors ===
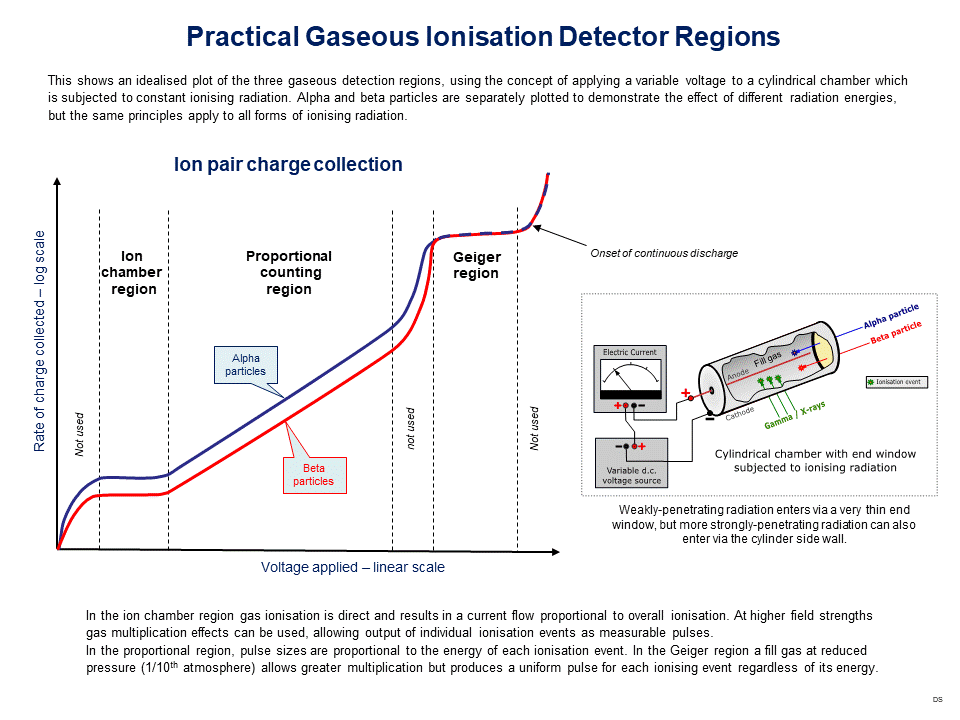
Plot of ion current as function of applied voltage for a wire cylinder gaseous radiation detector.

X-rays going through a gas will ionize it, producing positive ions and free electrons. An incoming photon will create a number of such ion pairs proportional to its energy. If there is an electric field in the gas chamber ions and electrons will move in different directions and thereby cause a detectable current. The behaviour of the gas will depend on the applied voltage and the geometry of the chamber. This gives rise to a few different types of gas detectors described below.

Ionization chambers use a relatively low electric field of about 100 V/cm to extract all ions and electrons before they recombine. This gives a steady current proportional to the dose rate the gas is exposed to. Ion chambers are widely used as hand held radiation survey meters to check radiation dose levels.

Proportional counters use a geometry with a thin positively charged anode wire in the center of a cylindrical chamber. Most of the gas volume will act as an ionization chamber, but in the region closest to the wire the electric field is high enough to make the electrons ionize gas molecules. This will create an avalanche effect greatly increasing the output signal. Since every electron cause an avalanche of approximately the same size the collected charge is proportional to the number of ion pairs created by the absorbed x-ray. This makes it possible to measure the energy of each incoming photon.

Geiger–Müller counters use an even higher electric field so that UV-photons are created. These start new avalanches, eventually resulting in a total ionization of the gas around the anode wire. This makes the signal very strong, but causes a dead time after each event and makes it impossible to measure the X-ray energies.

Gas detectors are usually single pixel detectors measuring only the average dose rate over the gas volume or the number of interacting photons as explained above, but they can be made spatially resolving by having many crossed wires in a wire chamber.

=== Silicon PN solar cells ===
It was demonstrated in the 1960s that silicon PN solar cells are suitable for detection of all forms of ionizing radiation including extreme UV, soft X-rays, and hard X-rays. This form of detection operates via photoionization, a process where ionizing radiation strikes an atom and releases a free electron. This type of broadband ionizing radiation sensor requires a solar cell, an ammeter, and a visible light filter on top of the solar cell that allows the ionizing radiation to hit the solar cell while blocking unwanted wavelengths.

=== Radiochromic film ===
Self-developing radiochromic film can provide very high resolution measurements, for dosimetry and profiling purposes, particularly in radiotherapy physics.
