= Lanthanum oxysulfide =

Names
- Other names lanthanum(3+); oxygen(2-); sulfide, lanthanum oxide sulfide, dilanthanum dioxide sulphide

Identifiers
CAS Number	13825-07-5
3D model (JSmol)	Interactive image
ChemSpider	8125521
ECHA InfoCard	100.031.578
EC Number	234-750-7
PubChem CID	9949910
CompTox Dashboard (EPA)	601014208
- InChI: InChI=1S/2La.2O.S/q2*+3;3*-2 Key: BZXKASZNANQGJD-UHFFFAOYSA-N
- SMILES: [O-2].[O-2].[S-2].[La+3].[La+3]

Properties
Chemical formula	La_{2}O_{2}S
Molar mass	341.88 g/mol
Appearance	yellowish-white crystals
Density	5.77 g/cm^{3}

Related compounds
Related compounds	Gadolinium oxysulfide
- Except where otherwise noted, data are given for materials in their standard state (at 25 °C [77 °F], 100 kPa). Infobox references

Lanthanum oxysulfide is an inorganic compound, a salt of lanthanum and hydrogen sulfide acid, with the formula La_{2}O_{2}S.

== Synthesis ==
- Calcination of lanthanum(III) sulfate in oxygen current at 750 °C:

La_{2}(SO_{4})_{3} + O_{2} → La_{2}O_{3}·SO_{3} + 2SO_{3}

- The resulting product is reduced with hydrogen when heated:

La_{2}O_{3}·SO_{3} + 4H_{2} → La_{2}O_{2}S + 4H_{2}O

== Physical properties ==
The compound forms yellowish-white hexagonal crystals.

== Uses ==
The compound is used as a laser host material.
