= Gadolinium oxysulfide =

Gadolinium Oxysulfide
Identifiers
CAS Number	12339-07-0
3D model (JSmol)	Interactive image
ChemSpider	8018486
ECHA InfoCard	100.032.350
EC Number	235-598-4
PubChem CID	9842771
CompTox Dashboard (EPA)	DTXSID001014298
- InChI: InChI=1S/2Gd.2O.S/q2*+3;3*-2 Key: MCVAAHQLXUXWLC-UHFFFAOYSA-N
- SMILES: [O-2].[O-2].[S-2].[Gd+3].[Gd+3]

Properties
Chemical formula	Gd_{2}O_{2}S
Molar mass	378.5638 g/mol
Appearance	white odorless powder
Density	7.32 g/cm^{3}, powder
Solubility in water	insoluble

Hazards
- GHS labelling
Pictograms	(GHS07: Exclamation mark)
Signal word	Warning
Hazard statements	H302, H312, H315, H319, H332, H335

Related compounds
Related compounds	Lanthanum oxysulfide
- Except where otherwise noted, data are given for materials in their standard state (at 25 °C [77 °F], 100 kPa). Infobox references

Gadolinium oxysulfide (Gd_{2}O_{2}S), also called gadolinium sulfoxylate, GOS or Gadox, is an inorganic compound, a mixed oxide-sulfide of gadolinium.

== Structure ==
Gadolinium oxysulfide has a trigonal crystal structure (space group 164). Each gadolinium ion is coordinated by four oxygen atoms and three sulfur atoms in a non-inversion symmetric arrangement. The Gd_{2}O_{2}S structure is a sulfur layer with double layers of gadolinium and oxygen in between.

== Uses ==
=== Ceramic scintillators ===
The main use of gadolinium oxysulfide is in ceramic scintillators. Scintillators are used in radiation detectors for medical diagnostics. The scintillator is the primary radiation sensor that emits light when struck by high energy photons. Gd_{2}O_{2}S based ceramics exhibit final densities of 99.7% to 99.99% of the theoretical density (7.32 g/cm^{3}) and an average grain size ranging from 5 micrometers to 50 micrometers in dependence with the fabrication procedure. Two powder preparation routes have been successful for synthesizing Gd_{2}O_{2}S: Pr, Ce, F powder complexes for the ceramic scintillators. These preparations routes are called the halide flux method and the sulfite precipitation method. The scintillation properties of Gd_{2}O_{2}S: Pr, Ce, F complexes demonstrate that this scintillator is promising for imaging applications. There are two main disadvantages to this scintillator; one being the hexagonal crystal structure, which emits only optical translucency and low external light collection at the photodiode. The other disadvantage is the high X-ray damage to the sample.

Terbium-activated gadolinium oxysulfide is frequently used as a scintillator for x-ray imaging. It emits wavelengths between 382-622 nm, though the primary emission peak is at 545 nm. It is also used as a green phosphor in projection CRTs, though its drawback is marked lowering of efficiency at higher temperatures. Variants include, for example, using praseodymium instead of terbium (CAS registry number 68609-42-7, EINECS number 271-826-9), or using a mixture of dysprosium and terbium for doping (CAS number 68609-40-5, EINECS number 271-824-8).

=== Luminescent host material ===
Gadolinium oxysulfide is a promising luminescent host material, because of its high density (7.32 g/cm^{3}) and high effective atomic number of Gd. These characteristics lead to a high interaction probability for X-ray radiation. Several synthesis routes have been developed for processing Gd_{2}O_{2}S phosphors, including: solid state reaction method, reduction method, combustion synthesis method, emulsion liquid membrane method, and gas sulfuration method. The solid state reaction method and reduction methods are most commonly used because of their high reliability, low cost, and high luminescent properties. (Gd0.99, Pr0.01)2O2S sub-microphosphors synthesized by homogeneous precipitation method are very promising for a new green emitting material to be applied to the high resolution digital X-ray imaging field Gadolinium oxysulfide powder phosphors are intensively used for conversion of X-rays to visible light in medical X-ray imaging. Gd_{2}O_{2}S: Pr based solid state X-ray detectors have been successfully reintroduced to X-ray sampling in medical computed tomography (imaging by sections or sectioning, through the use of any kind of penetrating wave).

== Safety ==
Inhalation may result in lung injuries. Exposure to gadolinium compounds may cause lung and/or liver damage. Contact with the skin may cause rash, redness or dermatitis. When Gadolinium oxysulfide comes in contact with mineral acids, hydrogen sulfide can be produced.
