= Photostimulated luminescence =

The phosphor plate radiography process

Photostimulated luminescence (PSL) is the release of stored energy within a phosphor by stimulation with visible light, to produce a luminescent signal. X-rays may induce such an energy storage. A plate based on this mechanism is called a photostimulable phosphor (PSP) plate (or imaging plate) and is one type of X-ray detector used in projectional radiography. Creating an image requires illuminating the plate twice: the first exposure, to the radiation of interest, "writes" the image, and a later, second illumination (typically by a visible-wavelength laser) "reads" the image. The device to read such a plate is known as a phosphorimager (occasionally spelled phosphoimager, perhaps reflecting its common application in molecular biology for detecting radiolabeled phosphorylated proteins and nucleic acids).

Projectional radiography using a photostimulable phosphor plate as an X-ray detector can be called "phosphor plate radiography" or "computed radiography" (not to be confused with computed tomography which uses computer processing to convert multiple projectional radiographies to a 3D image).

== Structure and mechanism ==
=== Energy storage ===
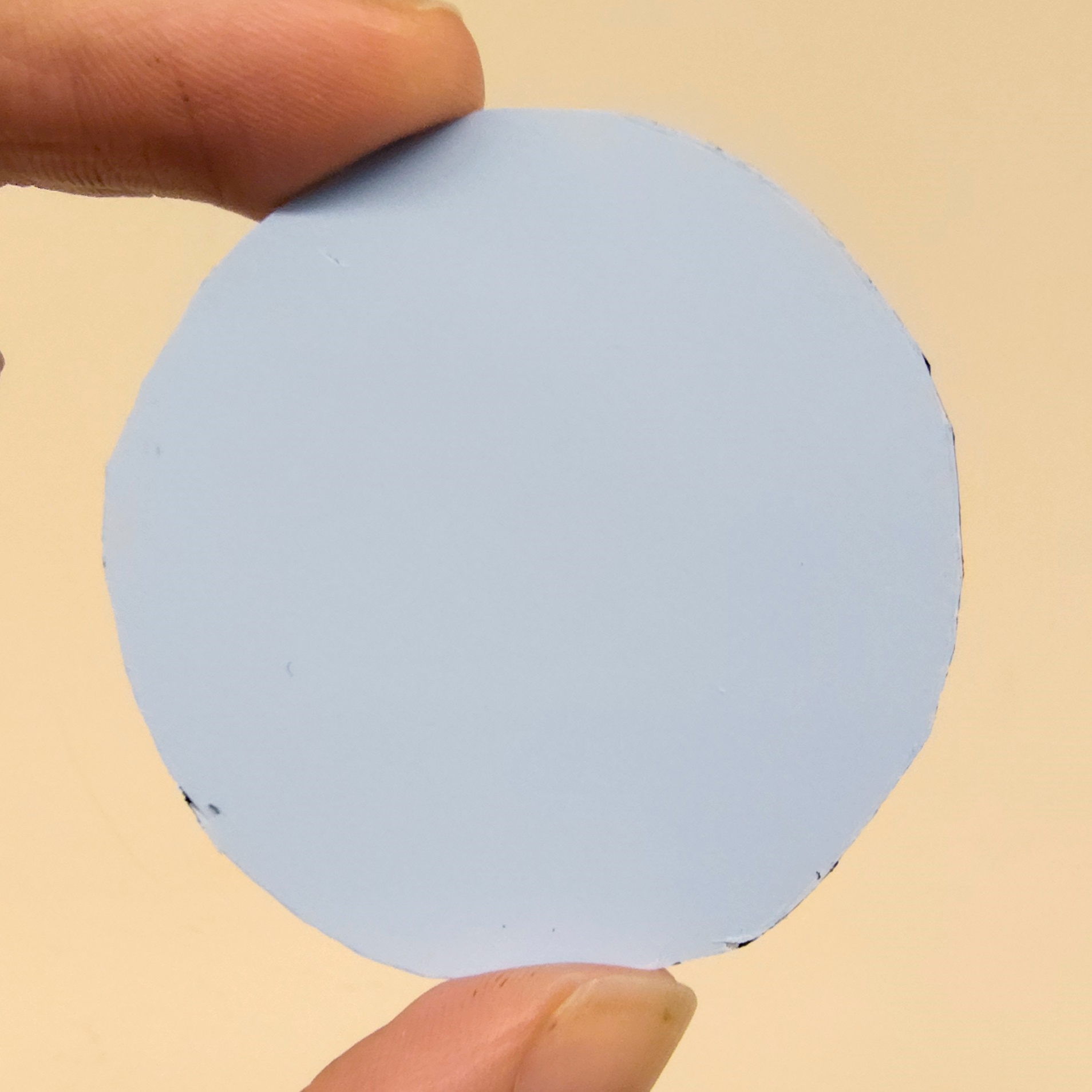
A circular cut of a PSP plate

On photostimulable phosphor (PSP) plates, the phosphor layer is typically 0.1 to 0.3 mm thick. After the initial exposure by short-wavelength (typically, X-ray) electromagnetic radiation, excited electrons in the phosphor material remain 'trapped' in 'colour centres' ("F-centers") in the crystal lattice until stimulated by the second illumination. For example, Fuji's photostimulable phosphor is deposited on a flexible polyester film support with grain size about 5 micrometers, and is described as "barium fluorobromide containing a trace amount of bivalent europium as a luminescence center". Europium is a divalent cation that replaces barium to create a solid solution. When Eu^{2+} ions are struck by ionizing radiation, they lose an additional electron to become Eu^{3+} ions. These electrons enter the conduction band of the crystal and become trapped in the bromine ion empty lattice of the crystal, resulting in a metastable state that is higher in energy than the original condition.

=== Energy release and digitalization ===
Readout of a PSP plate

A lower-frequency light source that is insufficient in energy to create more Eu^{3+} ions can return the trapped electrons to the conduction band. As these mobilized electrons encounter Eu^{3+} ions, they release a blue-violet 400 nm luminescence. This light is produced in proportion to the number of trapped electrons, and thus in proportion to the original X-ray signal. It can be collected often by a photomultiplier tube, which is clocked at a specific resolution or pixel capture frequency. The light is thereby converted to an electronic signal and significantly amplified. The electronic signal is then quantized via an ADC to discrete (digital) values for each pixel and placed into the image processor pixel map.

=== Reuse ===
Afterwards, the plates can be "erased," by exposing the plate to room-intensity white light. Thereby, the plate can be used over and over again. Imaging plates can theoretically be re-used thousands of times if they are handled carefully and under certain radiation exposure conditions. PSP plate handling under industrial conditions often results in damage after a few hundred uses. Mechanical damage such as scratches and abrasions are common, as well as radiation fatigue or imprinting due to high energy applications. An image can be erased by simply exposing the plate to a room-level fluorescent light - but more efficient, complete erasure is required to avoid signal carry-over and artifacts. Most laser scanners automatically erase the plate (current technology uses red LED lighting) after laser scanning is complete. The imaging plate can then be re-used.

Reusable phosphor plates are environmentally safe but need to be disposed of according to local regulations due to the composition of the phosphor, which contains the heavy metal Barium.

== Uses ==
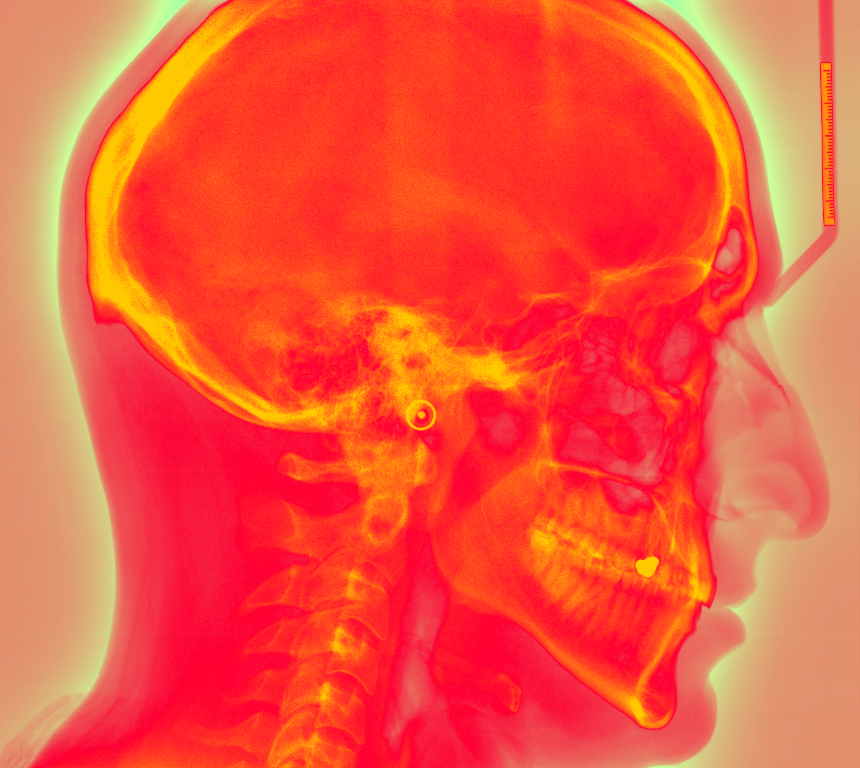

Computed radiography is used for both industrial radiography and medical projectional radiography. Image plate detectors have also been used in numerous crystallography studies.

=== Medical X-ray Imaging ===
In phosphor plate radiography, the imaging plate is housed in a special cassette and placed under the body part or object to be examined and the x-ray exposure is made. The imaging plate is then run through a special laser scanner, or CR reader, that reads and converts the image to a digital radiograph. The digital image can then be viewed and enhanced using software that has functions very similar to other conventional digital image-processing software, such as contrast, brightness, filtration and zoom. CR imaging plates (IPs) can be retrofitted to existing exam rooms and used in multiple x-ray sites since IPs are processed through a CR reader (scanner) that can be shared between multiple exam rooms.

==== Differences from Direct Radiography ====
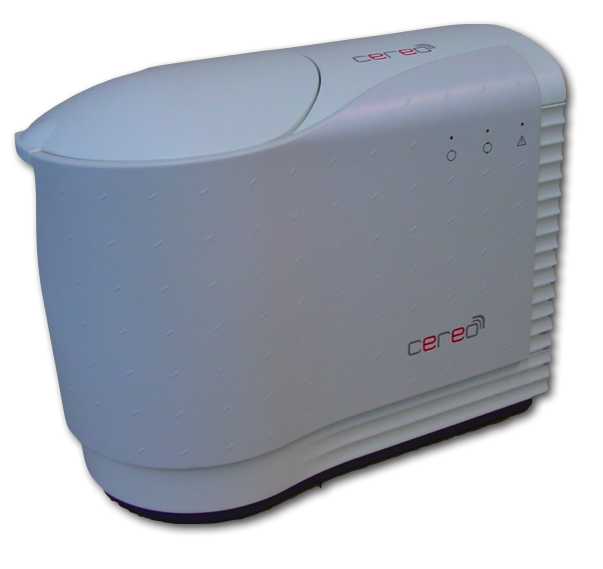
CeReO - PSP plate scanner

PSP plate radiography is often distinguished from Direct Radiography (DR). Direct radiography usually refers to image capture onto an amorphous silicon or selenium flat panel detector (FPD), the data being directly passed electronically to the processing computer. PSP plate radiography instead uses a cassette containing the imaging plate, which stores the image until it is read out and loaded into the computer. This additional extra step, from exposing the detector to a viewable digital image, is the main difference between the two techniques.

PSP plates and DR FPDs are typically used for projectional radiography. This should not be confused with fluoroscopy, where there is a continuous beam of radiation and the images appear on the screen in real time, for which PSP plates cannot be used.

=== Physics ===
PSP plates are commonly used as x-ray detectors for measurements in high energy-density physics. Examples include self-emission imaging of inertial confinement fusion implosions, backlit radiographic microscopy, and spatially-resolved emission spectroscopy of quantum dots.

== History ==
Image plates were pioneered for commercial medical use by Fuji in the 1980s.

== See also ==
- X-ray image intensifier
- Radioluminescence
- Spinthariscope
- Fluoroscopy
- Digital radiography
