= Digital radiography =

Form of radiography

Digital radiography is a form of radiography that uses x-ray–sensitive plates to directly capture data during the patient examination, immediately transferring it to a computer system without the use of an intermediate cassette. Advantages include time efficiency through bypassing chemical processing and the ability to digitally transfer and enhance images. Also, less radiation can be used to produce an image of similar contrast to conventional radiography.

Instead of X-ray film, digital radiography uses a digital image capture device. This gives advantages of immediate image preview and availability; elimination of costly film processing steps; a wider dynamic range, which makes it more forgiving for over- and under-exposure; as well as the ability to apply special image processing techniques that enhance overall display quality of the image.

== Detectors ==
=== Flat panel detectors ===
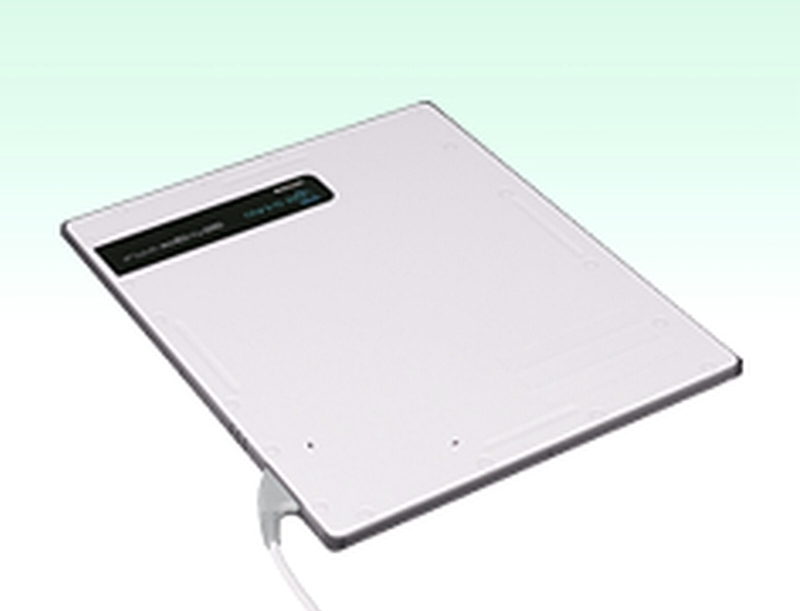
Flat panel detector used in digital radiography

Flat panel detectors (FPDs) are the most common kind of direct digital detectors. They are classified in two main categories:

1. Indirect FPDs Amorphous silicon (a-Si) is the most common material of commercial FPDs. Combining a-Si detectors with a scintillator in the detector’s outer layer, which is made from caesium iodide (CsI) or gadolinium oxysulfide (Gd_{2}O_{2}S), converts X-rays to light. Because of this conversion the a-Si detector is considered an indirect imaging device. The light is channeled through the a-Si photodiode layer where it is converted to a digital output signal. The digital signal is then read out by thin film transistors (TFTs) or fiber-coupled CCDs.

2. Direct FPDs. Amorphous selenium (a-Se) FPDs are known as “direct” detectors because X-ray photons are converted directly into charge. The outer layer of the flat panel in this design is typically a high-voltage bias electrode. X-ray photons create electron-hole pairs in a-Se, and the transit of these electrons and holes depends on the potential of the bias voltage charge. As the holes are replaced with electrons, the resultant charge pattern in the selenium layer is read out by a TFT array, active matrix array, electrometer probes or microplasma line addressing.

=== Other direct digital detectors ===
Detectors based on CMOS and charge-coupled device (CCD) have also been developed, but despite lower costs compared to FPDs of some systems, bulky designs and worse image quality have precluded widespread adoption.

A high-density line-scan solid state detector is composed of a photostimulable barium fluorobromide doped with europium (BaFBr:Eu) or caesium bromide (CsBr) phosphor. The phosphor detector records the X-ray energy during exposure and is scanned by a laser diode to excite the stored energy which is released and read out by a digital image capture array of a CCD.

=== Phosphor plate radiography ===
Phosphor plate radiography resembles the old analogue system of a light sensitive film sandwiched between two x-ray sensitive screens, the difference being the analogue film has been replaced by an imaging plate with photostimulable phosphor (PSP), which records the image to be read by an image reading device, which transfers the image usually to a picture archiving and communication system (PACS). It is also called photostimulable phosphor (PSP) plate-based radiography or computed radiography (not to be confused with computed tomography which uses computer processing to convert multiple projectional radiographies to a 3D image).

After X-ray exposure the plate (sheet) is placed in a special scanner where the latent image is retrieved point by point and digitized, using laser light scanning. The digitized images are stored and displayed on the computer screen. Phosphor plate radiography has been described as having an advantage of fitting within any pre-existing equipment without modification because it replaces the existing film; however, it includes extra costs for the scanner and replacement of scratched plates.

Initially phosphor plate radiography was the system of choice; early DR systems were prohibitively expensive (each cassette costs £40-£50K), and as the 'technology was being taken to the patient', prone to damage. Since there is no physical printout, and after the readout process a digital image is obtained, CR has been known as an indirect digital technology, bridging the gap between x-ray film and fully digital detectors.

== Industrial usage ==
=== Security ===
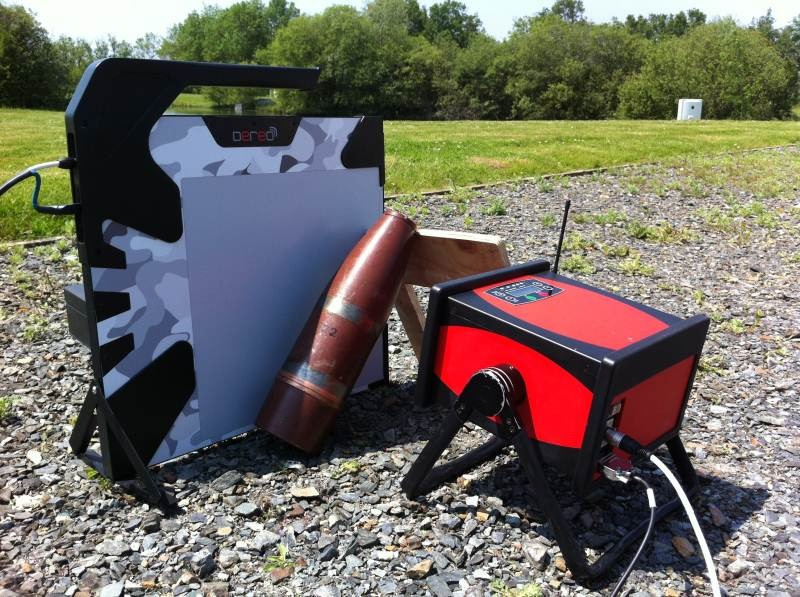
EOD (Explosive Ordnance Disposal) training and material testing. A 105 mm shell is radiographied with battery powered portable X-ray generator and flat panel detector.

Digital radiography (DR) has been used in various forms (for example, CCD and amorphous silicon imagers) in security X-ray inspection for more than 20 years and is increasingly replacing film for inspection X-rays in the security and nondestructive testing (NDT) fields. Reported advantages of DR in security NDT include image quality, a high probability of detection (POD), portability, environmental friendliness, and immediate imaging.

=== Materials ===
Nondestructive testing of materials is vital in fields such as aerospace and electronics where integrity of materials is vital for safety and cost reasons. Advantages of digital technologies include the ability to provide results in real time.

== History ==
Direct x-ray imaging system (DXIS) - real time display

=== Key developments ===
1983	Phosphor stimulated radiography systems first brought into clinical use by Fujifilm Medical Systems.
1987	Digital radiography in dentistry first introduced as "RadioVisioGraphy".
1995	French company Signet introduce the first dental digital panoramic system.
	First amorphous silicon and amorphous selenium detectors introduced.
2001	First commercial indirect CsI FPD for mammography and general radiography made available.
2003	Wireless CMOS detectors for dental work first made available by Schick Technologies.

== See also ==
- Dental radiography
- Fluoroscopy
- X-ray detectors
