= Kruithof =

Kruithof is a surname. Notable people with the surname include:

- Arie Andries Kruithof (1909–1993), Dutch physicist, professor of applied physics at Eindhoven University of Technology
- Jaap Kruithof (1929–2009), Belgian philosopher and writer

== See also ==
- Kruithof curve, relating the illuminance and colour temperature of light sources
