= Dark adaptor goggles =

Eyewear used to adapt the wearer's eyes to dark environments

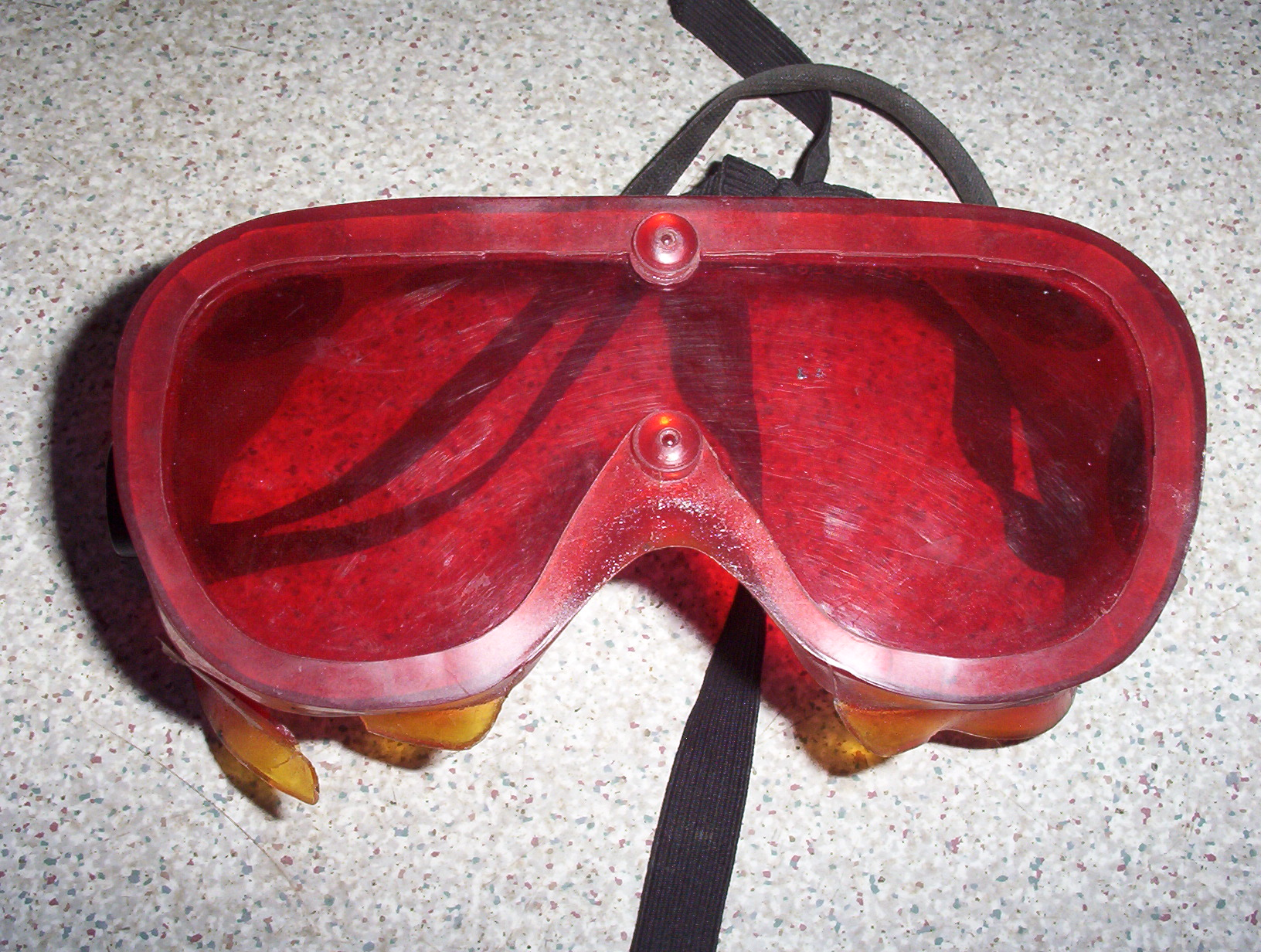
Dark adaptor goggles

Dark adaptor goggles, also called red adaptation goggles, are goggles are made with red-tinted plastic lenses. They were invented by Wilhelm Trendelenburg in 1916, based on the work by Antoine Béclère on dark adaptation of the eye. The eyewear are often used by observers to induce or preserve their natural night vision when in conditions of stronger light.

== Concept ==
Dark adaptor goggles are goggles made with red-tinted plastic lenses, invented by Wilhelm Trendelenburg in 1916. The concept is based on the work by Antoine Béclère on dark adaptation of the eye, where it is noted that fluoroscopy relies on the use of the retinal rods of the eye. Since retinal rods have limited sensitivity to long wavelengths of light, such as red light, while retinal cones do not, the goggles enabled the physicians to adapt their eyes in preparation for the fluoroscopic procedure while still being able to perform other work. Prior to the invention of these goggles, physicians were required to sit for extended periods in the darkened room where the procedure would be performed in order to adapt their eyes to the low lighting conditions.

Dark adaptor goggles are often used by pilots, weather observers, and physicians to induce or preserve their natural night vision when staying in a more lit place. In particular, the dark adaptor goggles are used in the field of meteorology and astronomy for adapting the eyes to the dark prior to an observation at night. They also aid with the identification of clouds during bright sunshine or glare from snow. Physicians have used the goggles to adapt their eyes in preparation for fluoroscopic procedures.

== See also ==
- Color blind glasses
- Green eyeshade
- Night-vision device
- Photochromic lens
- Purkinje effect
- Sunglasses
