= Shoe-fitting fluoroscope =

X-ray fluoroscope machines installed in shoe stores 1920s-1970s

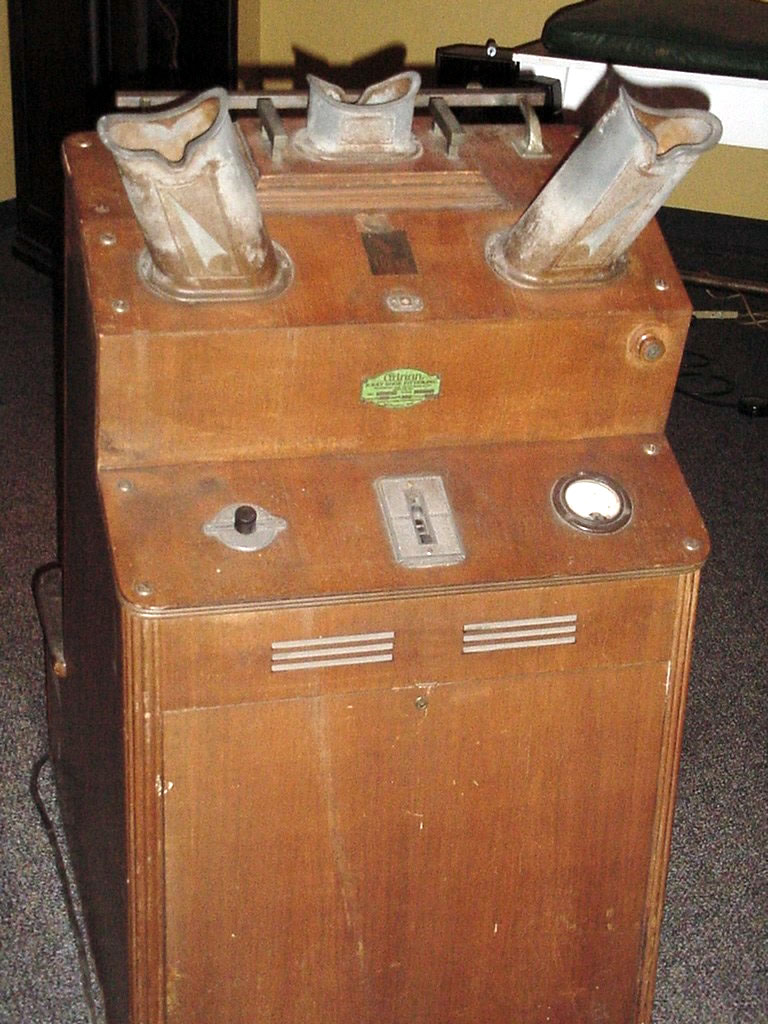
A shoe fluoroscope displayed at the US National Museum of Health and Medicine. This machine was manufactured by Adrian Shoe Fitter, Inc. c. 1938 and used in a Washington, D.C., shoe store.

The shoe-fitting fluoroscope, also sold under the names X-ray Shoe Fitter, Pedoscope and Foot-o-scope, was an X-ray fluoroscope machine installed in shoe stores from the 1920s until about the 1970s. The device was a metal construction covered in finished wood, approximately 4 feet (1.2 m) tall in the shape of short column, with a ledge with an opening through which the standing customer (adult or child) would put their feet and look through a viewing porthole at the top of the fluoroscope down at the X-ray view of the feet and shoes. Two other viewing portholes on either side enabled the parent and a sales assistant to observe the toes being wiggled to show how much room for the toes there was inside the shoe. The bones of the feet were clearly visible, as was the outline of the shoe, including the stitching around the edges.

The machines were sold in the United States, Canada, United Kingdom, Australia, South Africa, Germany and Switzerland. In the UK, they were known as Pedoscopes, after the company based in St. Albans that manufactured them.

In the second half of the 20th century, growing awareness of radiation hazards and increasingly stringent regulations forced their gradual phasing out. They were widely used particularly when buying shoes for children, whose shoe size continually changes until adulthood.

== History ==
There are multiple claims for the invention of the shoe-fitting fluoroscope. The most likely is Jacob Lowe, who demonstrated a modified medical device at shoe retailer conventions in 1920 in Boston and in 1921 in Milwaukee. Lowe filed a US patent application in 1919, granted in 1927, and assigned it to the Adrian Company of Milwaukee for US$15,000. Syl Adrian claims that his brother, Matthew Adrian, invented and built the first machine in Milwaukee; his name is featured in a 1922 advertisement for an X-ray shoe fitter. Clarence Karrer, the son of an X-ray equipment distributor, claims to have built the first unit in 1924 in Milwaukee, but had his idea stolen and patented by one of his father's employees. In the meantime, the British company Pedoscope filed a British patent application in 1924, granted in 1926, and claimed to have been building these machines since 1920.

The X-ray Shoe Fitter Corporation of Milwaukee and Pedoscope Company became the largest manufacturers of shoe-fitting fluoroscopes in the world.

== Health concerns ==
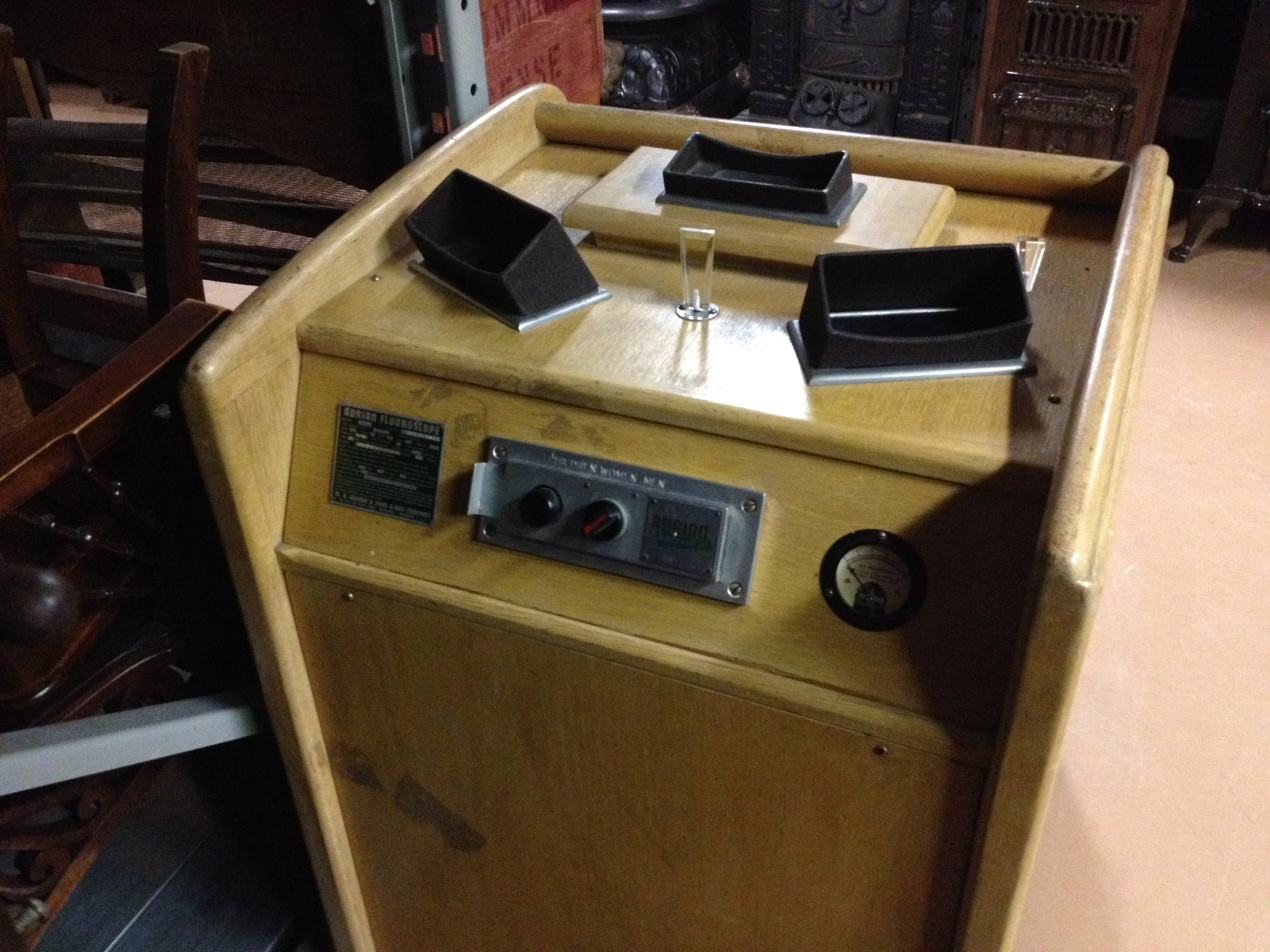
An Adrian Fluoroscope at the Dufferin County Museum, Ontario, Canada

The risk of radiation burns to extremities was known since Wilhelm Röntgen's 1895 experiment, but this was a short-term effect with early warning from reddening of the skin (erythema). The long-term risks from chronic exposure to radiation began to emerge with Hermann Joseph Muller's 1927 paper showing genetic effects, and the incidence of bone cancer in radium dial painters of the same time period. However, there was not enough data to quantify the level of risk until atomic bomb survivors began to experience the long-term effects of radiation in the late 1940s. The first scientific evaluations of these machines in 1948 immediately sparked concern for radiation protection and electrical safety reasons, and found them ineffective at shoe fitting.

Large variations in dose were possible depending on the machine design, displacement of the shielding materials, and the duration and frequency of use. Radiation surveys showed that American machines delivered an average of 13 roentgen (r) (roughly 0.13 sievert (Sv) of equivalent dose in modern units) to the customer's feet during a typical 20-second viewing, with one capable of delivering 116 r (c. 1 Sv) in 20 seconds. British Pedoscopes produced about one tenth of the radiation.

A customer might try several shoes in a day, or return several times in a year, and radiation dose effects may be cumulative. A dose of 300 r can cause growth disturbance in a child, and 600 r can cause erythema in an adult. Hands and feet are relatively resistant to other forms of radiation damage, such as carcinogenesis.

Although most of the dose was directed at the feet, a substantial amount would scatter or leak in all directions. Shielding materials were sometimes displaced to improve image quality, to make the machine lighter, or out of carelessness, and this aggravated the leakage. The resulting whole-body dose may have been hazardous to the salesmen, who were chronically exposed, and to children, who are about twice as radiosensitive as adults. Monitoring of American salespersons found dose rates at pelvis height of up to 95 mr/week, with an average of 7.1 mr/week (up to c. 50 mSv/a, average c. 3.7 mSv/a effective dose). A 2007 paper suggested that even higher doses of 0.5 Sv/a were plausible. The most widely accepted model of radiation-induced cancer posits that the incidence of cancers due to ionizing radiation increases linearly with effective (i.e. whole-body) dose.

Years or decades may elapse between radiation exposure and a related occurrence of cancer, and no follow-up studies of customers can be performed for lack of records. According to a 1950 medical article on the machines: "Present evidence indicates that at least some radiation injuries are statistical processes that do not have a threshold. If this evidence is valid, there is no exposure which is absolutely safe and which produces no effect." Three shoe salespersons were identified with rare conditions that might have been associated with their chronic occupational exposure: a severe radiation burn requiring amputation in 1950, a case of dermatitis with ulceration in 1957, and a case of basal-cell carcinoma of the sole in 2004.

=== Shoe industry response ===
Representatives of the shoe retail industry denied claims of potential harm in newspaper articles and opinion pieces. They argued that use of the devices prevented harm to customers' feet from poorly-fitted shoes.

== Regulation ==
There were no applicable regulations when shoe-fitting fluoroscopes were introduced. An estimated 10,000 machines were sold in the US, 3,000 in the UK, 1,500 in Switzerland, and 1,000 in Canada before authorities began discouraging their use. As understanding grew of the long-term health effects of radiation, a variety of bodies began speaking out and regulating the machines.

- 1931: ACXRP recommends limiting dose to 0.1 r per day (c. 0.5 r/week) in all applications.
- 1934: IXRPC recommends limiting dose to 0.2 r per day (c. 1 r/week) in all applications.
- 1946: ASA recommends limiting foot dose to 2 r per 5 second exposure, with a limit of 12 exposures per year for children.
- 1948: Warnings specific to the shoe-fitting fluoroscope start appearing in US journals.
- 1949: Tripartite Conference on Radiation Protection recommends lowering the dose limits:
  - 0.3 rep/week (c. 0.3 r/week) for whole body bone marrow
  - 1.5 rep/week (c. 1.5 r/week) for the hands
- 1950:
  - Warnings start appearing in UK journals.
  - A public inquiry was held in Queensland, Australia and warned against uncontrolled use
  - ICRP adopts the Tripartite recommendations, with some lack of clarity about units.
- 1953:
  - A definitive recommendation against use on children is published in the journal Pediatrics.
  - US Food and Drug Administration bans the machines.
- 1954:
  - NCRP recommends reducing dose limits by a factor of 10 for children, and other changes:
  - 15.6 mSv/a (c. 0.03 r/week) for whole body bone marrow
  - 78 mSv/a (c. 0.15 r/week) for the hands
- 1956: UK Ministry of Health considers regulating the machines.
- 1957:
  - Pennsylvania is the first US state to ban use of these machines.
  - ICRP recommends limiting occupational whole body dose to 50 mSv/a (c. 0.1 r/week)
- 1958:
  - The UK Government requires all machines be fitted with a warning sign advising customers of possible health risks, and that they should not use a machine more than 12 times a year.
  - NCRP recommends limiting public whole body dose to 5 mSv/a (c. 0.01 r/week)
- 1960: 160 devices are still in use in the Canton of Zürich.
- 1970s:
  - By 1970, 33 US states have banned the machine.
  - Late 1970s: Last recorded sighting of a shoe-fitting fluoroscope in service in Boston.
- 1973: The last devices still in use in West Germany are banned.
- 1989: Switzerland prohibits the machines.
- 1990: ICRP recommends reducing limits on exposure and other changes:
  - Occupational foot dose to 500 mSv/a (c. 1 r/week)
  - Occupational whole body dose to 20 mSv/a (c. 0.04 r/week)
  - Public whole body dose to 1 mSv/a (c. 0.002 r/week)

== In popular culture ==
- Early on in the novel It by Stephen King, Eddie Kaspbrak remembers using and being enthralled by a shoe-fitting fluoroscope as a boy. Eddie remembers that this agonized his mother, who orders him to get away from the device because she believes that these machines cause cancer.
- In the novel The House Without a Christmas Tree, the young protagonist Addie Mills describes these devices.
- In 1999, Time placed Shoe-Store X Rays on a list of the 100 worst ideas of the 20th century.
- A shoe-fitting fluoroscope appeared on a 2011 episode of the History series American Restoration.
- A shoe-fitting fluoroscope can be seen near the beginning of the film Billion Dollar Brain starring Michael Caine, when his character uses it to establish the contents of a flask.
- A shoe-fitting fluoroscope is featured in the novel Shadow Ticket by Thomas Pynchon.
- A shoe-fitting fluoroscope is mentioned in the novel Underworld by Don DeLillo.
