= GUCA1B =

Protein-coding gene in the species Homo sapiens

Identifiers
- Aliases: GUCA1B, GCAP2, GUCA2, RP48, guanylate cyclase activator 1B, GCAP 2
- External IDs: OMIM: 602275; MGI: 1194489; GeneCards: GUCA1B

Gene location (Human)
Chr.	Chromosome 6 (human)
Band	6p21.1	Start	42,183,284 bp
Band	6p21.1	End	42,194,956 bp

Gene location (Mouse)
Chr.	Chromosome 17 (mouse)
Band	17|17 C	Start	47,696,318 bp
Band	17|17 C	End	47,703,892 bp
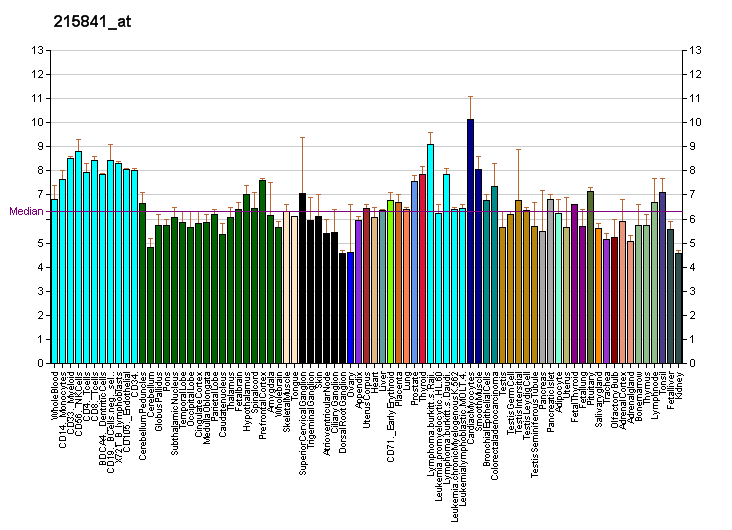
RNA expression pattern
Bgee	Human / Mouse (ortholog); Top expressed in: testicle; cerebellar hemisphere; granulocyte; right hemisphere of cerebellum; tibialis anterior muscle; gastrocnemius muscle; stromal cell of endometrium; tibial nerve; trabecular bone; right uterine tube / Top expressed in: layer of retina; neural layer of retina; embryo; embryo; quadriceps femoris muscle; outer nuclear layer; islet of Langerhans; bone marrow; zone of skin; lens; More reference expression data
BioGPS	More reference expression data
Gene ontology
Molecular function	calcium ion binding; guanylate cyclase regulator activity; metal ion binding; calcium sensitive guanylate cyclase activator activity
Cellular component	photoreceptor inner segment; membrane; plasma membrane; photoreceptor outer segment; photoreceptor disc membrane
Biological process	phototransduction; response to stimulus; cell-cell signaling; positive regulation of guanylate cyclase activity; regulation of guanylate cyclase activity; receptor guanylyl cyclase signaling pathway; body fluid secretion; visual perception; regulation of rhodopsin mediated signaling pathway
Sources:Amigo / QuickGO
Orthologs
Databases	NCBI: entry; OMA: entry
Species	Human	Mouse
Entrez	2979	107477
Ensembl	ENSG00000112599	ENSMUSG00000023979
UniProt	Q9UMX6	Q8VBV8
RefSeq (mRNA)	NM_002098	NM_146079
RefSeq (protein)	NP_002089	NP_666191
Location (UCSC)	Chr 6: 42.18 – 42.19 Mb	Chr 17: 47.7 – 47.7 Mb
PubMed search
- Wikidata
View/Edit Human	View/Edit Mouse

Guanylyl cyclase-activating protein 2 is an enzyme that in humans is encoded by the GUCA1B gene. Alternative names:

- Guanylate cyclase activator 1B
- Retinal guanylyl cyclase activator protein p24

== Biological Role ==
Guanylyl cyclase-activating protein 2 is proposed to play a role in dark adaptation. Under scotopic conditions, calcium ions bind to three putative EF-hand calcium binding motifs which reduces the protein's ability to stimulate guanylyl cyclase. This contributes to the maintained responsiveness of rod photoreceptors through hyperpolarizing them during sustained darkness.
