= Kruithof curve =

Region of color temperatures that are often viewed as pleasing to an observer

The Kruithof curve, with an example light source; D65 (Northern daylight), inside the pleasing region.

The Kruithof curve describes a region of illuminance levels and color temperatures that are often viewed as comfortable or pleasing to an observer. The curve was constructed from psychophysical data collected by Dutch physicist Arie Andries Kruithof, though the original experimental data is not present on the curve itself. Lighting conditions within the bounded region were empirically assessed as being pleasing or natural, whereas conditions outside the region were considered uncomfortable, displeasing, or unnatural. The Kruithof curve is a sufficient model for describing sources that are considered natural or closely resemble Planckian black bodies, but its value in describing human preference has been consistently questioned by further studies on interior lighting.

For example, natural daylight has a color temperature of 6500 K and an illuminance of about 10^{4} to 10^{5} lux. This color temperature–illuminance pair results in natural color rendition, but if viewed at a low illuminance, would appear bluish. At typical indoor office illuminance levels of about 400 lux, pleasing color temperatures are lower (between 3000 and 6000 K), and at typical home illuminance levels of about 75 lux, pleasing color temperatures are even lower (between 2400 and 2700 K). These color temperature-illuminance pairs are often achieved with fluorescent and incandescent sources, respectively. The pleasing region of the curve contains color temperatures and illuminance levels comparable to naturally lit environments.

== History ==
At the emergence of fluorescent lighting in 1941, Kruithof conducted psychophysical experiments to provide a technical guide to design artificial lighting. Using gas-discharge fluorescent lamps, Kruithof was able to manipulate the color of emitted light, and asked observers to report as to whether or not the source was pleasing to them. The sketch of his curve as presented consists of three major regions: the middle region, which corresponds to light sources considered pleasing; the lower region, which corresponds to colors that are considered cold and dim; and the upper region, which corresponds to colors that are warm and unnaturally colorful. These regions, while approximate, are still used to determine appropriate lighting configurations for homes or offices.

== Perception and adaptation ==
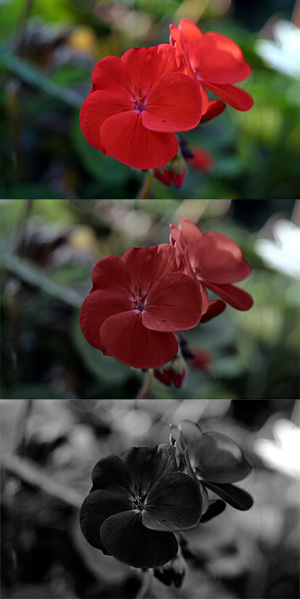
Simulated appearance of a red geranium and foliage in normal bright-light (photopic) vision, dusk (mesopic) vision, and night (scotopic) vision. The blueish flower centers are still perceived as bright in the image of the flower viewed at dusk and at night.

Kruithof's findings are directly related to human adaptation to changes in illumination. As illuminance decreases, human sensitivity to blue light increases. This is known as the Purkinje effect. The human visual system switches from photopic (cone-dominated) vision to scotopic (rod-dominated) vision when luminance levels decrease. Rods have a very high spectral sensitivity to blue energy, whereas cones have varying spectral sensitivities to reds, greens, and blues. Since the dominating photoreceptor in scotopic vision is most sensitive to blue, human sensitivity to blue light is therefore increased. Because of this, intense sources of higher (bluer) color temperatures are all generally considered to be displeasing at low luminance levels, and a narrow range of pleasing sources exist. Subsequently, the range of pleasing sources increases in photopic vision as luminance levels are increased.

== Criticism ==
While the curve has been used as a guide to design artificial lighting for indoor spaces, with the general suggestion to use sources with low correlated color temperatures (CCT) at low illuminances, Kruithof did not describe the method of evaluation, the independent variables, nor the test sample that were used to develop the curve. Without these data, nor other validation, the conclusions should not be considered credible. The relationship between illuminance and CCT was not supported by subsequent work.

Illuminance and CCT has been examined in many studies of interior lighting, and these studies consistently demonstrate a different relationship to that suggested by Kruithof. Rather than having upper and lower boundaries, these studies do not suggest CCT to have significant effect, and recommend only to avoid illuminance levels below 300 lux. Current studies have not explored the main critical portion that comprises low illumination regimes, or the low CCT range beneath 3000K in general, although some studies have been conducted on levels down to 2850K. This lacuna in the data is particularly important, as it relates to almost all "lifestyle" environments in which lighting designers operate, such as hotels, restaurants, retail spaces, and residential settings. Further evaluations of how illuminance and CCT affects individuals within certain environments could help to expand the research on the health implications of light on the circadian rhythm.

== Further studies ==
The Kruithof curve, as presented, does not contain experimental data points, and serves as an approximation for desirable lighting conditions. Therefore, its scientific accuracy has been reassessed.

The color rendering index (CRI) is a metric for describing the appearance of a source and whether or not it is considered pleasing. The color rendering index of a given source is a measure of that source's ability to faithfully reproduce colors of an object. Light sources, like candles or incandescent light bulbs, produce spectrums of electromagnetic energy that closely resemble Planckian black bodies; they look much like natural sources. Many fluorescent lamps or LED light bulbs have spectrums that do not match those of Planckian blackbodies and are considered unnatural. Therefore, the way that they render the perceived colors of an environment may be also considered unnatural. While these newer sources can still achieve correlated color temperatures and illuminance levels that are within the comfortable region of the Kruithof curve, variability in their color rendering indices may cause these sources to ultimately be displeasing.

Different activities or scenarios call for different color temperature–illuminance pairs: preferred light sources change depending on the scenario the source is illuminating. Individuals preferred color temperature–illuminance pairs within the comfortable region for dining, socializing, and studying, but also preferred color temperature–illuminance pairs that were in the lower uncomfortable region for nighttime activities and preparing for bed. This is linked to the Purkinje effect; individuals who desire some light at nighttime desire lower (redder) color temperatures, even if luminance levels are very low.

Kruithof's findings may also vary as a function of culture or geographic location. Desirable sources are based on an individual's previous experiences of perceiving color, and as different regions of the world may have their own lighting standards, each culture would likely have its own acceptable light sources.

The illuminance of a source is the dominating factor for deciding as to whether or not a source is pleasing or comfortable, as viewers participating in this experiment evaluated a range of correlated color temperatures and illuminance levels, yet their impressions remained generally unchanged as correlated color temperature changed. Additionally, there is a relationship between correlated color temperature and apparent brightness of a source. From these findings, it is evident that color rendering index, in place of correlated color temperature, may be a more appropriate metric for determining as to whether or not a certain source is considered pleasing.

== See also ==
- Melanopsin
- Melatonin
