= Purkinje effect =

Tendency for sight to shift toward blue colors at low light levels

An animated sequence of simulated appearances of a red flower (of a zonal geranium) and background foliage under photopic, mesopic, and scotopic conditions

The Purkinje effect or Purkinje phenomenon, sometimes called the Purkinje shift (often pronounced /pərˈkɪndʒi/), is the tendency for the peak luminance sensitivity of the eye to shift toward the blue end of the color spectrum at low illumination levels as part of dark adaptation. In consequence, reds will appear darker relative to other colors as light levels decrease. The effect is named after the Czech anatomist Jan Evangelista Purkyně (Czech: [ˈpurkɪɲɛ]). While the effect is often described from the perspective of the human eye, it is well established in a number of animals under the same name to describe the general shifting of spectral sensitivity due to pooling of rod and cone output signals as a part of dark/light adaptation.

This effect introduces a difference in color contrast under different levels of illumination. For instance, in bright sunlight, geranium flowers appear bright red against the dull green of their leaves, or adjacent blue flowers, but in the same scene viewed at dusk, the contrast is reversed, with the red petals appearing a dark red or black, and the leaves and blue petals appearing relatively bright.

The sensitivity to light in scotopic vision (Note: low light conditions) varies with wavelength, though the perception is essentially black-and-white. The Purkinje shift is the relation between the absorption maximum of rhodopsin, reaching a maximum at about 500 nanometres (2.0×10^{−5} in), and that of the opsins in the longer-wavelength cones that dominate in photopic vision (Note: well-lit conditions), about 555 nanometres (2.19×10^{−5} in) (green).

In visual astronomy, the Purkinje shift can affect visual estimates of variable stars when viewers use comparison stars of different colors, especially if one of the stars is red.

== Physiology ==
The Purkinje effect occurs at the transition between primary use of the photopic (cone-based) and scotopic (rod-based) systems, that is, in the mesopic state: as intensity dims, the rods take over, and before color disappears completely, it shifts towards the rods' top sensitivity.

The effect occurs because in mesopic conditions the outputs of cones in the retina, which are generally responsible for the perception of color in daylight, are pooled with outputs of rods which are more sensitive under those conditions and have peak sensitivity in the greenish blue wavelength of 507 nm.

== Use of red lights ==
The insensitivity of rods to long-wavelength (i.e. red) light has led to the use of red lights under certain special circumstances—for example, in the control rooms of submarines, research laboratories, aircraft, and naked-eye astronomy.

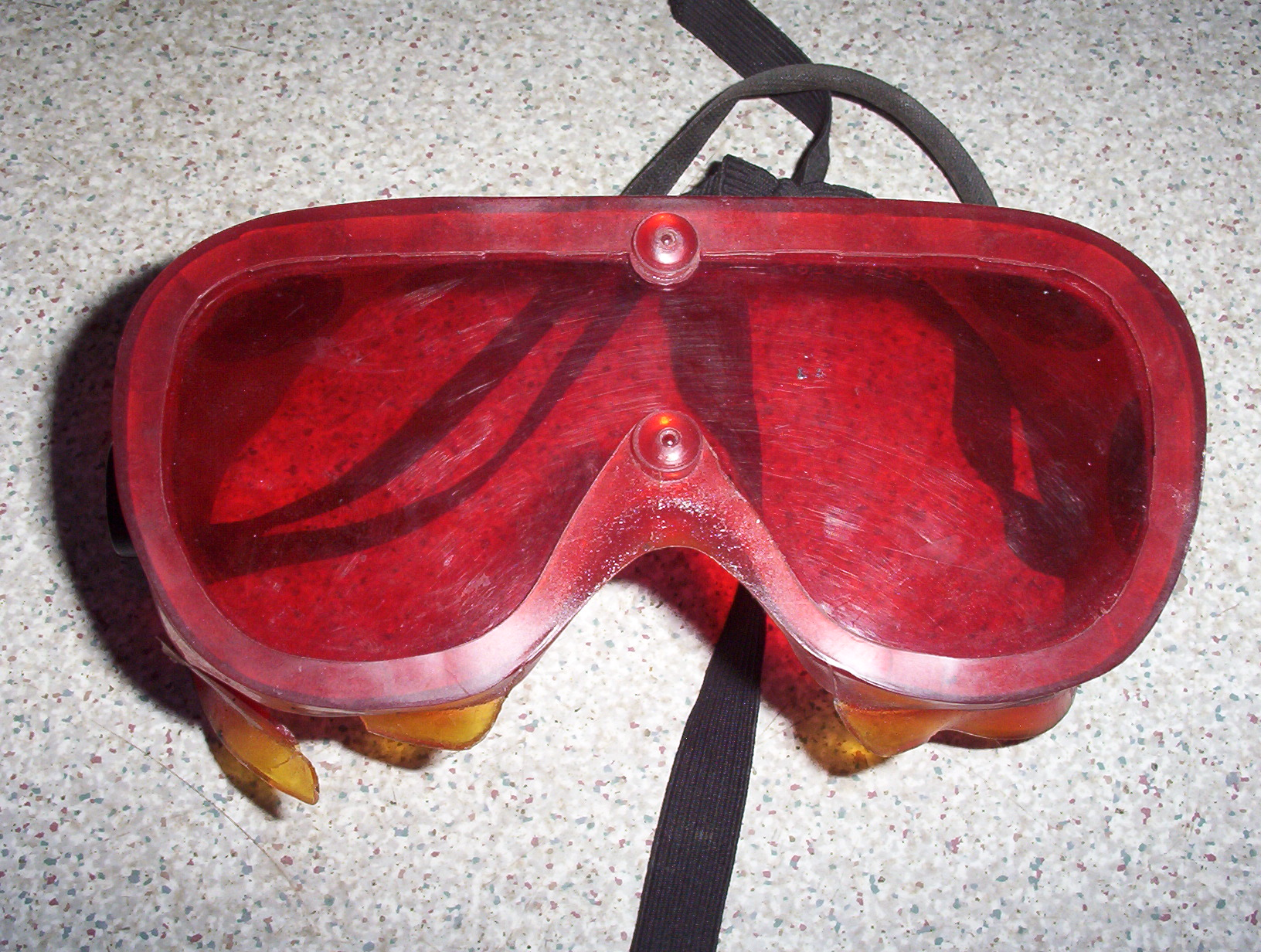
Dark adaptor goggles

Red lights are used in conditions where it is desirable to activate both the photopic and scotopic systems. Submarines are well lit to facilitate the vision of the crew members working there, but the control room must be lit differently to allow crew members to read instrument panels yet remain dark adjusted to operate the periscope at night. By using red lights or wearing red goggles (called "dark adaptor goggles"), the cones can receive enough light to provide photopic vision (namely the high-acuity vision required for reading). The rods are not saturated by the bright red light because they are not sensitive to long-wavelength light, so the crew members remain dark adapted. Similarly, airplane cockpits use red lights so pilots can read their instruments and maps while maintaining night vision to see outside the aircraft.

Red lights are also often used in research settings. Many research animals (such as rats and mice) have limited photopic vision, as they have far fewer cone photoreceptors. The animal subjects do not perceive red lights and thus experience darkness (the active period for nocturnal animals), but the human researchers, who have one kind of cone (the "L cone") that is sensitive to long wavelengths, are able to read instruments or perform procedures that would be impractical even with fully dark adapted (but low acuity) scotopic vision. For the same reason, zoo displays of nocturnal animals often are illuminated with red light.

== History ==
The effect was discovered in 1819 by Jan Evangelista Purkyně. Purkyně was a polymath who would often meditate at dawn during long walks in the blossomed Bohemian fields. Purkyně noticed that his favorite flowers appeared bright red on a sunny afternoon, while at dawn they looked very dark. He reasoned that the eye has not one but two systems adapted to see colors, one for bright overall light intensity, and the other for dusk and dawn.

Purkyně wrote in his Neue Beiträge:

Objectively, the degree of illumination has a great influence on the intensity of color quality. In order to prove this most vividly, take some colors before daybreak, when it begins slowly to get lighter. Initially one sees only black and grey. Particularly the brightest colors, red and green, appear darkest. Yellow cannot be distinguished from a rosy red. Blue became noticeable to me first. Nuances of red, which otherwise burn brightest in daylight, namely carmine, cinnabar and orange, show themselves as darkest for quite a while, in contrast to their average brightness. Green appears more bluish to me, and its yellow tint develops with increasing daylight only.

== See also ==
- Kruithof curve
- Dark adaptation
- Dark adaptor goggles
- Skot (unit)
- Nox (unit)
