= Adaptation (eye) =

Response of the eye to light and dark

In visual physiology, adaptation is the ability of the retina of the eye to adjust to various levels of light. Natural night vision, or scotopic vision, is the ability to see under low-light conditions. In humans, rod cells are exclusively responsible for night vision, as cone cells are only able to function at higher illumination levels. Night vision is of lower quality than day vision because it is limited in resolution and colors cannot be discerned; only shades of gray are seen. In order for humans to transition from day to night vision they must undergo a dark adaptation period of up to two hours in which each eye adjusts from a high to a low luminescence "setting", increasing sensitivity hugely, by many orders of magnitude. This adaptation period is different between rod and cone cells and results from the regeneration of photopigments to increase retinal sensitivity. Light adaptation, in contrast, works very quickly, within seconds.

== Efficiency ==
The human eye can function from very dark to very bright levels of light; its sensing capabilities reach across nine orders of magnitude. This means that the brightest and the darkest light signal that the eye can sense are a factor of roughly 1,000,000,000 apart. However, in any given moment of time, the eye can only sense a contrast ratio of 1,000. What enables the wider reach is that the eye adapts its definition of what is black.

The eye takes approximately 20–30 minutes to fully adapt from bright sunlight to complete darkness and becomes 10,000 to 1,000,000 times more sensitive than at full daylight. In this process, the eye's perception of color changes as well (this is called the Purkinje effect). However, it takes approximately five minutes for the eye to adapt from darkness to bright sunlight. This is due to cones obtaining more sensitivity when first entering the dark for the first five minutes but the rods taking over after five or more minutes. Cone cells are able to regain maximum retinal sensitivity in 9–10 minutes of darkness whereas rods require 30–45 minutes to do so.

Dark adaptation is far quicker and deeper in young people than the elderly.

=== Cones vs. rods ===
Normalised absorption spectra of the three human photopsins and of human rhodopsin (dashed).

The human eye contains three types of photoreceptors, rods, cones, and intrinsically photosensitive retinal ganglion cells (ipRGCs). Rods and cones are responsible for vision and connected to the visual cortex. ipRGCs are more connected to body clock functions and other parts of the brain but not the visual cortex. Rods and cones can be easily distinguished by their structure. Cone photoreceptors are conical in shape and contain cone opsins as their visual pigments. There exist three types of cone photoreceptors, each being maximally sensitive to a specific wavelength of light depending on the structure of their opsin photopigment. The various cone cells are maximally sensitive to either short wavelengths (blue light), medium wavelengths (green light), or long wavelengths (red light). Rod photoreceptors only contain one type of photopigment, rhodopsin, which has a peak sensitivity at a wavelength of approximately 500 nanometers which corresponds to blue-green light. The distribution of photoreceptor cells across the surface of the retina has important consequences for vision. Cone photoreceptors are concentrated in a depression in the center of the retina known as the fovea centralis and decrease in number towards the periphery of the retina. Conversely, rod photoreceptors are present at high density throughout most of the retina with a sharp decline in the fovea. Perception in high luminescence settings is dominated by cones despite the fact that they are greatly outnumbered by rods (approximately 4.5 million to 91 million).

== Ambient light response ==
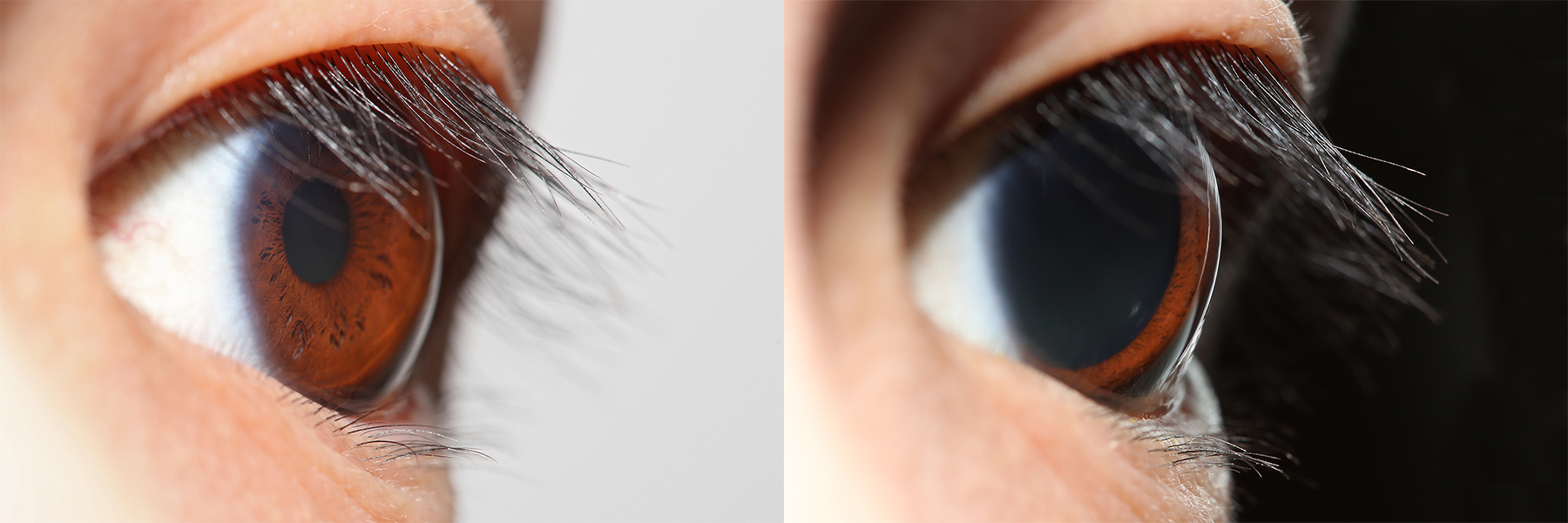
The pupillary light reflex is a quick but minor mechanism of adaptation

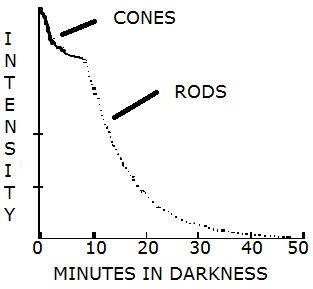
Visual Response to Darkness. Cones work at high light levels (during the day but also during driving at night in the headlamp spotlight). Rods take over at twilight and night. The y-axis has logarithmic scaling.

A minor mechanism of adaptation is the pupillary light reflex, adjusting the amount of light that reaches the retina very quickly by about a factor of ten. Since it contributes only a tiny fraction of the overall adaptation to light it is not further considered here.

In response to varying ambient light levels, rods and cones of eye function both in isolation and in tandem to adjust the visual system. Changes in the sensitivity of rods and cones in the eye are the major contributors to dark adaptation.

Above a certain luminance level (about 0.03 cd/m^{2}), the cone mechanism is involved in mediating vision; photopic vision. Below this level, the rod mechanism comes into play providing scotopic (night) vision. The range where two mechanisms are working together is called the mesopic range, as there is not an abrupt transition between the two mechanism. This adaptation forms the basis of the Duplicity Theory.

== Advantages of night vision ==
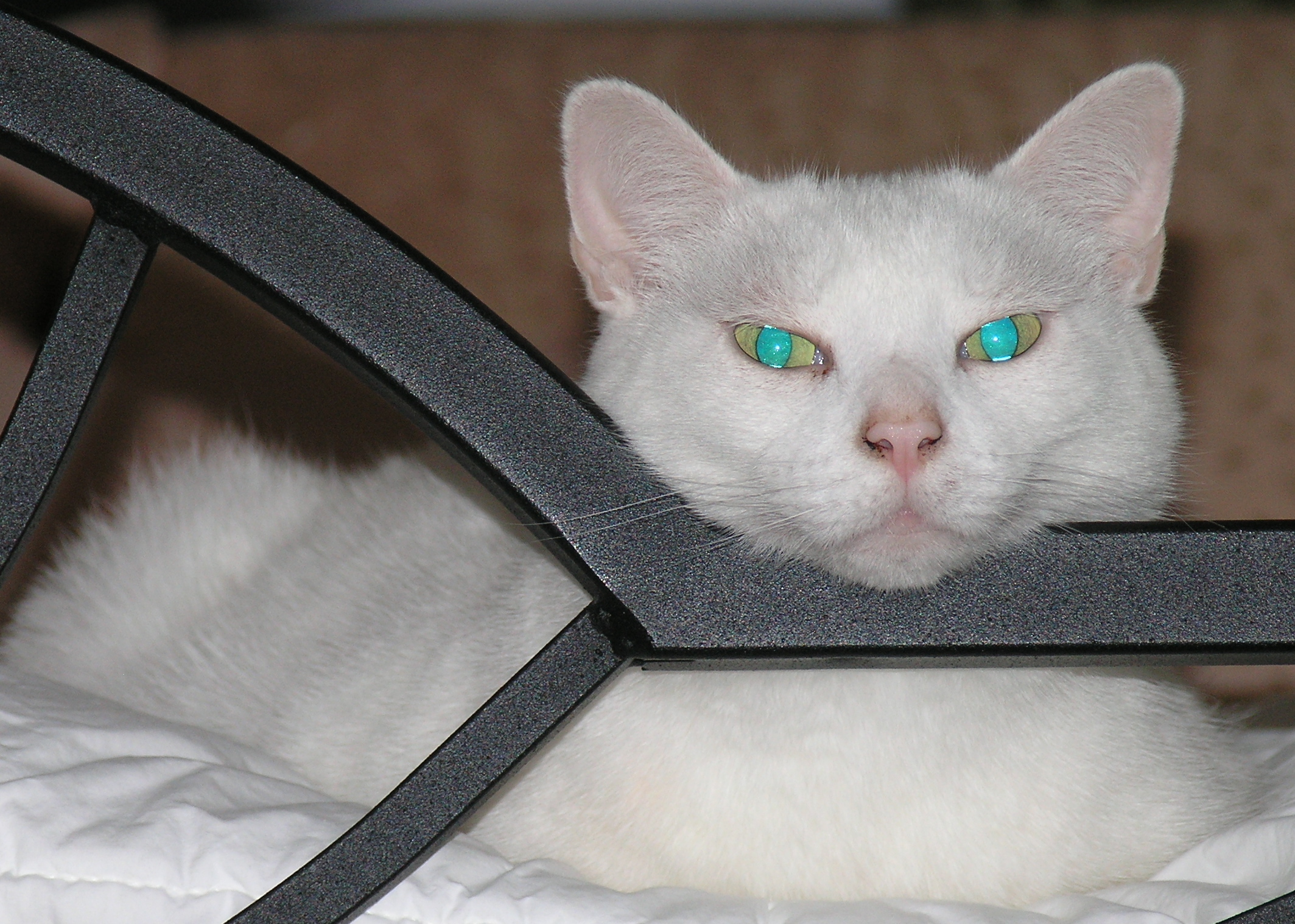
Reflection of camera flash from tapetum lucidum

Many animals such as cats possess high-resolution night vision, allowing them to discriminate objects with high frequencies in low illumination settings. The tapetum lucidum is a reflective structure that is responsible for this superior night vision as it mirrors light back through the retina exposing the photoreceptor cells to an increased amount of light. Most animals which possess a tapetum lucidum are nocturnal most likely because upon reflection of light back through the retina the initial images become blurred. Humans, like their primate relatives, do not possess a tapetum lucidum and therefore were predisposed to be a diurnal species.

Despite the fact that the resolution of human day vision is far superior to that of night vision, human night vision provides many advantages. Like many predatory animals, humans can use their night vision to prey upon and ambush other animals without their awareness. Furthermore, in the event of an emergency situation occurring at night, humans can increase their chances of survival if they are able to perceive their surroundings and get to safety. Both of these benefits can be used to explain why humans did not completely lose the ability to see in the dark from their nocturnal ancestors.

== Dark adaptation ==
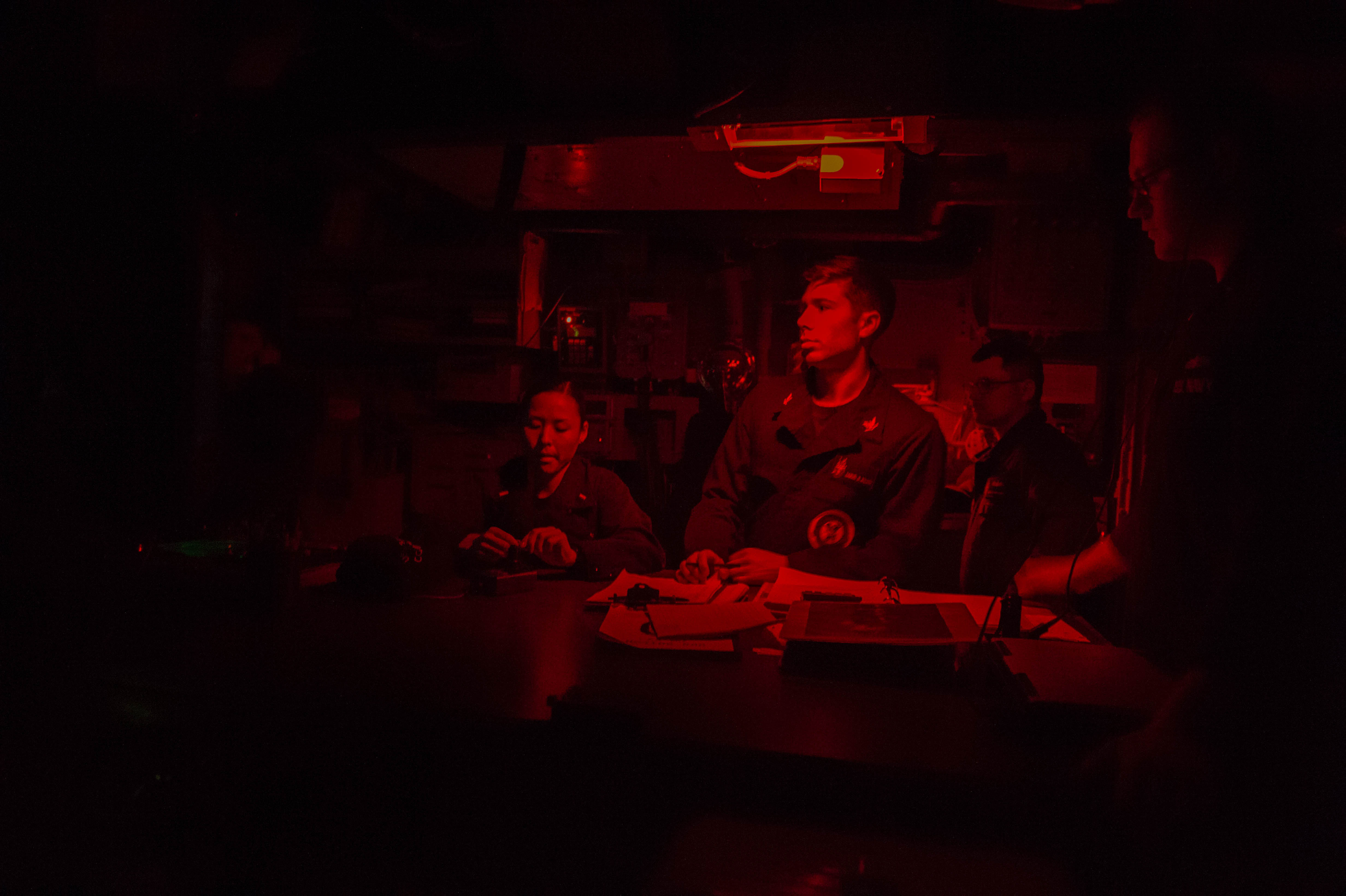
Extreme red light used on a ship's bridge at night to aid dark adaptation of the crew's eyes

Rhodopsin, a biological pigment in the photoreceptors of the retina, immediately photobleaches in response to light. Visual phototransduction starts with the isomerizing of the pigment chromophore from 11-cis to all-trans retinal. Then this pigment dissociates into free opsin and all-trans retinal. Dark adaptation of both rods and cones requires the regeneration of the visual pigment from opsin and 11-cis retinal. Therefore, the time required for dark adaptation and pigment regeneration is largely determined by the local concentration of 11-cis retinal and the rate at which it is delivered to the opsin in the bleached rods. The decrease in calcium ion influx after channel closing causes phosphorylation of metarhodopsin II and speeds up the cis-retinal to trans-retinal inactivation. The phosphorylation of activated rhodopsin is mediated by recoverin. The regeneration of the photopigments occurs during dark adaptation albeit at markedly different rates. Rods are more sensitive to light and so take longer to fully adapt to the change in light. Rods, whose photopigments regenerate more slowly, do not reach their maximum sensitivity for about two hours. Cones take approximately 9–10 minutes to adapt to the dark. Sensitivity to light is modulated by changes in intracellular calcium ions and cyclic guanosine monophosphate.

The sensitivity of the rod pathway improves considerably within 5–10 minutes in the dark. Color testing has been used to determine the time at which rod mechanism takes over; when the rod mechanism takes over colored spots appear colorless as only cone pathways encode color.

Three factors affect how quickly the rod mechanism becomes dominant:

- Intensity and duration of the pre-adapting light: By increasing the levels of pre-adapting luminances, the duration of cone mechanism dominance extends, while the rod mechanism switch over is more delayed. In addition the absolute threshold takes longer to reach. The opposite is true for decreasing the levels of pre-adapting luminances.
- Size and location on the retina: The location of the test spot affects the dark adaptation curve because of the distribution of the rods and cones in the retina.
- Wavelength of the threshold light: Varying the wavelengths of stimuli also affect the dark adaptation curve. Long wavelengths—such as extreme red—create the absence of a distinct rod/cone break, as the rod and cone cells have similar sensitivities to light of long wavelengths. Conversely, at short wavelengths the rod/cone break is more prominent, because the rod cells are much more sensitive than cones once the rods have dark adapted.

=== Intracellular signalling ===
Under scotopic conditions, intracellular cGMP concentration is high in photoreceptors. cGMP binds to and opens cGMP gated Na^{+} channels to allow sodium and calcium influx. Sodium influx contributes to depolarization while calcium influx increases local calcium concentrations near the receptor. Calcium binds to a modulatory protein, which is proposed to be GUCA1B, removing this protein's stimulatory effect on guanylyl cyclase. This reduces cGMP production by guanylyl cyclase to lower cGMP concentration during prolonged darkness. Elevated calcium concentration also increases the activity of phosphodiesterase which hydrolyses cGMP to further reduce its concentration. This reduces opening of the cGMP gated Na^{+} channels to hyperpolarise the cell, once again making it sensitive to small increases in brightness. Without dark adaptation, the photoreceptor would remain depolarized under scotopic conditions and so also remain unresponsive to small changes in brightness.

=== Inhibition ===
Inhibition by neurons also affects activation in synapses. Together with the bleaching of a rod or cone pigment, merging of signals on ganglion cells are inhibited, reducing convergence.

Alpha adaptation, i.e., rapid sensitivity fluctuations, is powered by nerve control. The merging of signals by virtue of the diffuse ganglion cells, as well as horizontal and amacrine cells, allow a cumulative effect. Thus that area of stimulation is inversely proportional to intensity of light, a strong stimulus of 100 rods equivalent to a weak stimulus of 1,000 rods.

In sufficiently bright light, convergence is low, but during dark adaptation, convergence of rod signals boost. This is not due to structural changes, but by a possible shutdown of inhibition that stops convergence of messages in bright light. If only one eye is open, the closed eye must adapt separately upon reopening to match the already adapted eye.

=== Measuring Dark Adaptation ===
Ophthalmologists sometimes measure patients' dark adaptation using an instrument known as a dark adaptometer.

There are multiple commercial dark adaptometers (AdaptDx, MetroVision MonCvONE, Roland Consult DARK-Adaptometer). Besides those free-viewing devices, a fundus-tracked workflow has been recently introduced by modifying a microperimetry device that enables testing of patients with unstable fixation.

==== Using Dark Adaptation Measurement to Diagnose Disease ====
Numerous clinical studies have shown that dark adaptation function is dramatically impaired from the earliest stages of Age-related Macular Degeneration (AMD), Retinitis Pigmentosa (RP), and other retinal diseases, with increasing impairment as the diseases progress. AMD is a chronic, progressive disease that causes a part of the retina, called the macula, to slowly deteriorate over time. It is the leading cause of vision loss among people age 50 and older. It is characterized by a breakdown of the RPE/Bruch's membrane complex in the retina, leading to an accumulation of cholesterol deposits in the macula. Eventually, these deposits become clinically visible drusen that affect photoreceptor health, causing inflammation and a predisposition to choroidal neovascularization (CNV). During the AMD disease course, the RPE/Bruch's function continues to deteriorate, hampering nutrient and oxygen transport to the rod and cone photoreceptors. As a side effect of this process, the photoreceptors exhibit impaired dark adaptation because they require these nutrients for replenishment of photopigments and clearance of opsin to regain scotopic sensitivity after light exposure.

Measurement of a patient's dark adaptation function is essentially a bioassay of the health of their Bruch's membrane. As such, research has shown that, by measuring dark adaptation, doctors can detect subclinical AMD at least three years earlier than it is clinically evident.

== Accelerating dark adaptation ==
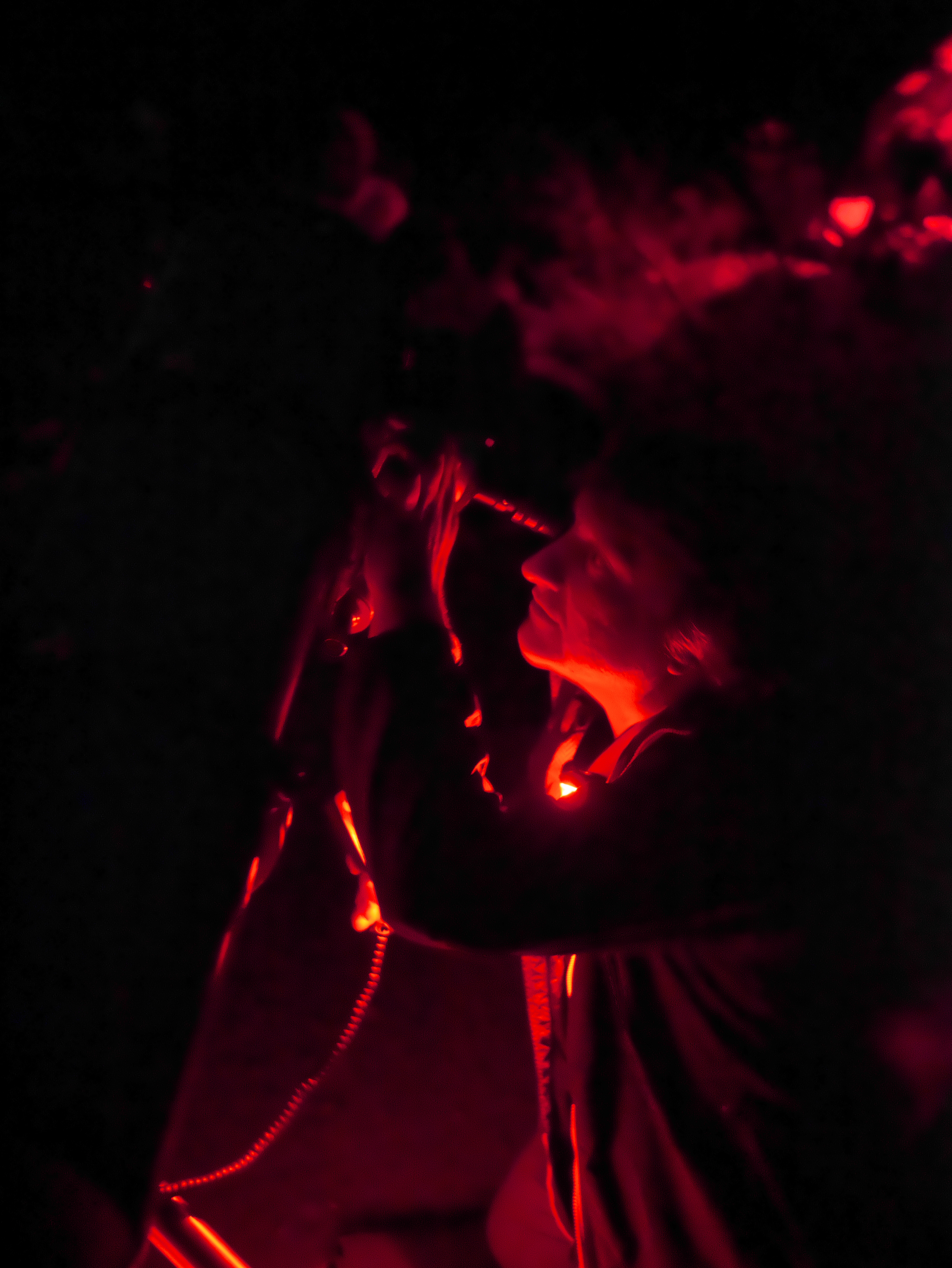
Astronomer preserves night vision

Several different methods, with varying levels of evidence, have been purported or demonstrated to increase the rate at which vision can adapt in the dark.

=== Red lights and lenses ===
As a result of rod cells having a peak sensitivity at a wavelength of 500 nanometers they cannot perceive all colours on the visual spectrum. Because rod cells are insensitive to long wavelengths, the use of red lights and red lens glasses has become a common practice for accelerating dark adaptation. In order for dark adaptation to be significantly accelerated an individual should ideally begin this practice 30 minutes prior to entering a low luminescence setting. This practice will allow an individual to maintain their photopic (day) vision whilst preparing for scotopic vision. The insensitivity to red light will prevent the rod cells from further becoming bleached and allow for the rhodopsin photopigment to recharge back to its active conformation. Once an individual enters a dark setting most of their rod cells will already be accommodated to the dark and be able to transmit visual signals to the brain without an accommodation period.

The concept of red lenses for dark adaptation is based upon experimentation by Antoine Béclère and his early work with radiology. In 1916, the scientist Wilhelm Trendelenburg invented the first pair of red adaptation goggles for radiologists to adapt their eyes to view screens during fluoroscopic procedures.

==== Evolutionary context ====
Although many aspects of the human visual system remain uncertain, the theory of the evolution of rod and cone photopigments is agreed upon by most scientists. It is believed that the earliest visual pigments were those of cone photoreceptors, with rod opsin proteins evolving later. Following the evolution of mammals from their reptilian ancestors approximately 275 million years ago there was a nocturnal phase in which complex colour vision was lost. Being that these pro-mammals were nocturnal they increased their sensitivity in low luminescence settings and reduced their photopic system from tetrachromatic to dichromatic. The shift to a nocturnal lifestyle would demand more rod photoreceptors to absorb the blue light emitted by the moon during the night. It can be extrapolated that the high ratio of rods to cones present in modern human eyes was retained even after the shift from nocturnal back to diurnal.

It is believed that the emergence of trichromacy in primates occurred approximately 55 million years ago when the surface temperature of the planet began to rise. The primates were diurnal rather than nocturnal in nature and therefore required a more precise photopic visual system. A third cone photopigment was necessary to cover the entire visual spectrum enabling primates to better discriminate between fruits and detect those of the highest nutritional value.

==== Applications ====
- Aviators commonly wear red lensed glasses or goggles prior to taking off in the dark to ensure that they are able to see outside of the aircraft. Furthermore, throughout flight the cockpit is illuminated with dim red lights. This lighting is to ensure that the pilot is able to read instruments and maps while maintaining scotopic vision for looking outside.
- Submarines: Oftentimes submarines are "rigged for red", meaning that the boat is going to be surfacing or coming to periscope depth at night. During such times illumination within certain compartments is switched to red light to allow the eyes of the lookouts and officers to adjust to the darkness prior to looking outside of the boat. Additionally, compartments on a submarine may be illuminated with red light in order to simulate night conditions for the crew.

=== Vitamin A ===
11-cis-Retinal2

Vitamin A is necessary for proper functioning of the human eye. The photopigment rhodopsin found in human rod cells is composed of retinal, a form of vitamin A, bound to an opsin protein. Upon the absorption of light rhodopsin was decomposed into retinal and opsin through bleaching. Retinal could then have one of two fates: it could recombine with opsin to reform rhodopsin or it could be converted into free retinol. The American scientist George Wald was the first to recognize that the visual system expends vitamin A and is dependent upon diet for its replacement.

Vitamin A serves many functions in the human body outside of healthy vision. It is vital in maintaining a healthy immune system as well as promoting normal growth and development. The average adult male and female should consume 900 and 700 micrograms of vitamin A per day, respectively. Consumption above 3000 micrograms per day can lead to acute or chronic hypervitaminosis A.

==== Sources of vitamin A ====
Vitamin A is present in both animal and plant sources as retinoids and carotenoids, respectively. Retinoids can be used immediately by the body upon absorption into the cardiovascular system; however, plant-based carotenoids must be converted to retinol prior to utilization by the body. The highest animal-based sources of vitamin A are liver, dairy products, and fish. Fruits and vegetables containing high amounts of carotenoids are dark green, yellow, orange, and red in colour.

==== Evolutionary context ====
Vitamin A-based opsin proteins have been used for sensing light in organisms for most of evolutionary history beginning approximately 3 billion years ago. This feature has been passed from unicellular to multicellular organisms including Homo sapiens. This vitamin was most likely selected by evolution for sensing light because retinal causes a shift in photoreceptor absorbance to the visible light range. This shift in absorbance is especially important for life on Earth because it generally matches the peak irradiance of sunlight on its surface. A second reason why retinal evolved to be vital for human vision is because it undergoes a large conformational change when exposed to light. This conformational change is believed to make it easier for the photoreceptor protein to distinguish between its silent and activated state thus better controlling visual phototransduction.

==== Experimental evidence ====
Various studies have been conducted testing the effective of vitamin A supplementation on dark adaptation. In a study by Cideciyan et al. the length of dark adaptation was measured in a patient with systemic vitamin A deficiency (VAD) before and after vitamin A supplementation. The dark adaptation function was measured prior to supplementation, 1 day post-treatment, and 75 days post-treatment. It was observed that after merely one day of vitamin A supplementation the recovery kinetics of dark adaptation were significantly accelerated after photoreceptor bleaching. Dark adaptation was further accelerated following 75 days of treatment.

A subsequent study by Kemp et al. studied dark adaptation in subjects with primary biliary cirrhosis and Crohn's disease, both of whom had vitamin A deficiency. Within 8 days of oral supplementation of vitamin A both patients had their visual function restored to normal. Furthermore, adaptation kinetics significantly improved in both subjects following supplementation.

Later independent studies in Sorsby fundus dystrophy confirmed the effect of Vitamin A on dark adaptation. Likewise, Vitamin A was shown to accelerate (to a lesser extent) dark adaptation in AMD.

=== Anthocyanins ===
Anthocyanins make up the majority of the 4000 known flavonoid phytochemicals. This group of approximately 600 bioactive antioxidants carries the strongest physiological effects of any plant compound. These chemicals are also the most visible of the flavonoid phytochemicals because they provide bright blue, red, or purple pigmentation to many plant species. Anthocyanins also serve to protect the photosynthetic tissues from the direct rays of the sun. In addition, the antioxidant, anti-inflammatory, and vasoprotective properties of anthocyanins allow them to demonstrate diverse health effects. In humans, anthocyanins are effective for a variety of health conditions including neurological damage, atherosclerosis, diabetes, as well as visual impairment. Anthocyanins frequently interact with other phytochemicals to potentiate biological effects; therefore, contributions from individual biomolecules remains difficult to decipher. As a result of anthocyanins providing bright colouration to flowers, the plants containing these phytochemicals are naturally successful in attracting pollinators such as birds and bees. The fruits and vegetables produced by such plants are also brightly pigmented attracting animals to eat them and disperse the seeds. Due to this natural mechanism anthocyanin-containing plants are widely abundant in most areas of the world. The high abundance and distribution of anthocyanin-containing plants make it a natural food source for many animals. Through fossil evidence it is known that these compounds were eaten in high amounts by primitive hominins.

During World Wars I and II British Air Force aviators were known to consume extensive amounts of bilberry jam. The aviators consumed this anthocyanin-rich food due to its many visual benefits, included accelerated dark adaptation, which would be valuable for night bombing missions.

==== Food sources ====
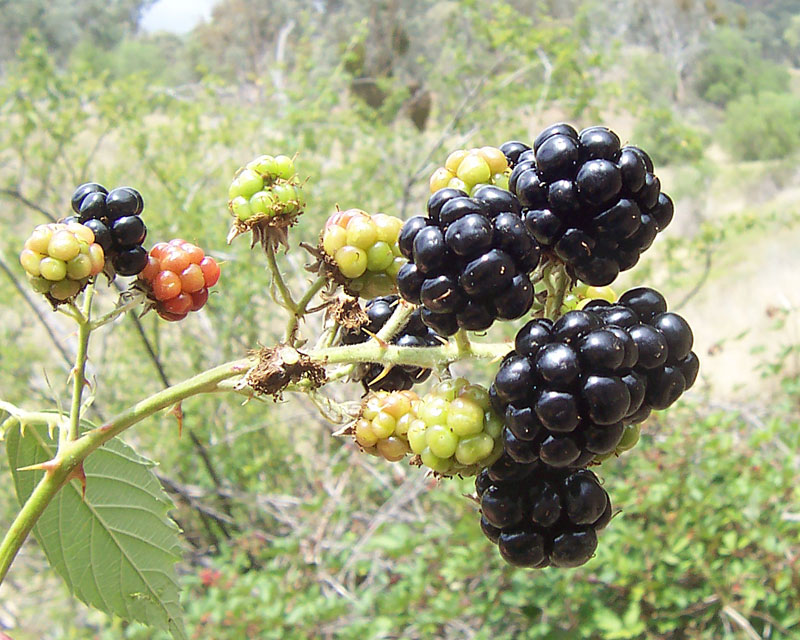
Blackberry fruits

Brightly coloured fruits and vegetables are rich in anthocyanins. This makes sense intuitively because anthocyanins offer pigmentation to plants. Blackberries are the most anthocyanin-rich foods, containing 89-211 milligrams per 100 grams. Other foods that are rich in this phytochemical include red onions, blueberries, bilberries, red cabbage, and eggplant. The ingestion of any of these food sources will yield a variety of phytochemicals in addition to anthocyanins because they naturally exist together. The daily intake of anthocyanins is estimated to be approximately 200 milligrams in the average adult; however, this value can reach several grams per day if an individual is consuming flavonoid supplements.

==== Effect on dark adaptation ====
Anthocyanins accelerate dark adaptation in humans by enhancing the regeneration of the rod photopigment, rhodopsin. Anthocyanins accomplish this by binding directly to opsin upon the degradation of rhodopsin to its individual constituents by light. Once bound to opsin, the anthocyanin changes its structure thereby accelerating its access to the retinal binding pocket. By having a diet rich in anthocyanins an individual is able to generate rhodopsin in shorter periods of time because of the increased affinity of opsin to retinal. Through this mechanism an individual is able to accelerate dark adaptation and achieve night vision in a shorter period of time.

==== Supportive evidence ====
In a double-blind, placebo-controlled study conducted by Nakaishi et al. a powdered anthocyanin concentrate derived from black currants was provided to a number of participants. Participants received one of three doses of anthocyanins to measure if the result occurred in a dose-dependent manner. The period of dark adaptation was measured prior to and two hours following supplementation in all participants. Results from this experiment indicate that anthocyanins significantly accelerated dark adaptation at merely one dose level compared to the placebo. Observing the data as a whole Nakaishi et al. concluded that anthocyanins effectively reduced the dark adaptation period in a dose-dependent manner.

==== Contradictory evidence ====
Despite the fact that many scientists believe anthocyanins to be beneficial in accelerating dark adaptation in humans, a study conducted by Kalt et al. in 2014 showed blueberry anthocyanins have no effect. In this study two double-blind, placebo-controlled studies were conducted to examine dark adaptation following the intake of blueberry products. In neither study did the blueberry anthocyanin intake affect the length of dark adaptation. From these results Kalt et al. concluded that blueberry anthocyanins provide no significant difference to the dark adaptation component of human vision.

== Light adaptation ==
With light adaptation, the eye has to quickly adapt to the background illumination to be able to distinguish objects in this background. The process for light adaptation occurs over a period of five minutes.

The photochemical reaction is:

Rhodopsin ⇌ retinal + opsin

=== Increment threshold ===
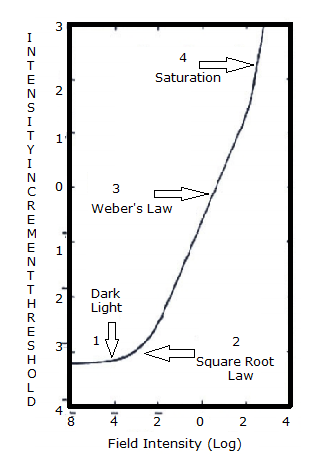
Schematic of the increment threshold curve of the rod system

Using increment threshold experiments, light adaptation can be measured clinically. In an increment threshold experiment, a test stimulus is presented on a background of a certain luminance, the stimulus is increased until the detection threshold is reached against the background. A monophasic or biphasic threshold versus intensity TVI curve is obtained through this method for both cones and rods.

When the threshold curve for a single system (i.e., just cones or just rods) is taken in isolation it can be seen to possess four sections:

1. Dark light
The threshold in this portion of the TVI curve is determined by the dark/light level. Sensitivity is limited by neural noise. The background field is relatively low and does not significantly affect threshold.
2. Square root law
This part of the curve is limited by quantal fluctuation in the background. The visual system is usually compared with a theoretical construct called the ideal light detector. To detect the stimulus, the stimulus must sufficiently exceed the fluctuations of the background (noise).
3. Weber's law
Threshold increases with background luminance proportional to the square root of the background.
4. Saturation
At saturation, the rod system becomes unable to detect the stimulus. This section of the curve occurs for the cone mechanism under high background levels.

== Insufficiency ==
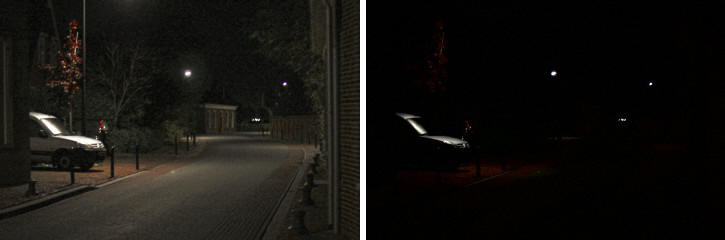
Effect of night blindness. Left: good night vision. Right: nightblind.

Insufficiency of adaptation most commonly presents as insufficient adaptation to dark environment, called night blindness or nyctalopia. The opposite problem, known as hemeralopia, that is, inability to see clearly in bright light, is much rarer.

The fovea is blind to dim light (due to its cone-only array) and the rods are more sensitive, so a dim star on a moonless night must be viewed from the side, so it stimulates the rods. This is not due to pupil width since an artificial fixed-width pupil gives the same results.

Night blindness can be caused by a number of factors the most common of which being vitamin A deficiency. If detected early enough nyctalopia can be reversed and visual function can be regained; however; prolonged vitamin A deficiency can lead to permanent visual loss if left untreated.

Night blindness is especially prominent in developing countries due to malnutrition and therefore a lack of vitamin A in the diet. In developed countries night blindness has historically been uncommon due to adequate food availability; however, the incidence is expected to increase as obesity becomes more common. Increased obesity rates correspond to an increased number of bariatric surgeries, causing malabsorption of vitamin A in the human body.

== See also ==
- Adaptive system
- Dark adaptor goggles
- Human eye
- Mesopic vision
- Neural adaptation
- Purkinje effect
- Disc shedding
