= Lubberts effect =

The Lubberts effect is the non-uniform response of an imaging system to X-rays that are absorbed at different depths within the input phosphor. It indicates an input phosphor depth-dependent response of the imaging system. It is named for G. Lubberts, who published a report of it in 1968 while working at Kodak. The Lubberts effect is related to the Swank effect, which relates the signal-to-noise ratio of a scintillator-based imaging system to the amount of random variation in the strength of the emitted photons.
