= Arie Andries Kruithof =

Dutch professor of applied physics

Arie Andries Kruithof (1909–1993) was a Dutch professor of applied physics at Eindhoven University of Technology, in the Netherlands.

Kruithof was born in Zeist. He studied physics at Utrecht University, where he obtained a doctor's degree from Leonard Ornstein in 1934. At Philips, he did research on lighting systems, especially gas-discharge lamps. Later he was appointed professor of applied physics at Eindhoven University of Technology, leading the Atomic Physics group, mainly researching gas discharges and plasmas.

He died in Son en Breugel in 1993.

The Kruithof curve, describing the influence of colour temperature on visual perception, is named after him.
