= Antoine Béclère =

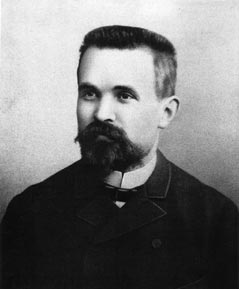
- Antoine Béclère
- Born: 17 March 1856; Paris
- Died: 24 February 1939 (aged 82); Paris
- Scientific career
- Fields: radiology

Antoine Louis Gustave Béclère (17 March 1856, Paris - 24 February 1939) was a French virologist and immunologist who was a pioneer in the field of radiology. In 1897 he created the first laboratory of radiology.

== Biography ==
Appointed hospital physician in 1893, he initially devoted himself to the study of infectious diseases and immunity. Just under a month after Wilhelm Röntgen's discovery of X-rays was made public (in an article of 28 December 1895), Oudin and Barthélemy's first fluoroscopy session on 20 January 1896 revealed to him the possible applications of X-rays in medicine.

In the summer of 1896, Antoine Béclère performed the first fluoroscopic screening for pulmonary tuberculosis on the maid of his friend Dr. Oudin. From then on, he became an ardent defender of radiology, both nationally and internationally. In March 1897, assisted by André Jousset, then an intern, he organized the first radiology course in France at the Hôpital Tenon. In 1897, he set up the first radiology laboratory at Tenon, where he had just been appointed head of department. In the absence of satisfactory facilities, he left Tenon for the Hôpital Saint-Antoine in 1898, where he set up France's first radiology center, which he ran until his retirement. He combined clinical practice with laboratory research, in particular to measure the new radiations, their intensity and their penetration into the body. In 1899, he published Les Rayons de Rœntgen et le diagnostic de la tuberculose. In 1908, he became a member of the Académie nationale de médecine. In 1909, together with Dr. Félix Blairon, he founded the “Société de radiologie médicale de Paris”, which has since become the Société française de radiologie. Pauline Ramart is his attaché in his radiotherapy department.

In 1928, having retired in 1922, he was elected President of the French Academy of Medicine.

In 1929, Antoine Béclère hosted the International Congress of Radiology in Paris. In 1931, he chaired the 3rd International Congress of Medical Radiology in Paris.

On his eightieth birthday in 1936, Béclère was presented with a Festschrift including an exposition of his career and work, with essays by disciples on its various elements. He died of a heart attack at his home, 122 rue La Boëtie, on 24 February 1939, at the age of 82. He continued working until his death. In an obituary of her father, Antoinette Béclère writes that between his eightieth birthday and his death, Béclère published 20 academic works.

Suffering from radiation burn, he had to have four fingers amputated.

== Bibliography ==
- Pallardy, G; Mabille, J P (1999), "Antoine Béclère (1856-1939). In memory of Antoinette Béclère, the admirable guardian of her father's works", Journal de radiologie, vol. 80, no. 6 (published Jun 1999), pp. 600–3, PMID 10417897
- Pallardy, G (1999), "La radiologie est entree avant l'electricite dans les hopitaux de Paris", Histoire des sciences médicales, vol. 33, no. 4, pp. 333–42, PMID 11625611
- Ratti, A (1982), "Antoinette Béclère and the Center for International Relations in Radiology (Antoine Béclère)", La Radiologia medica, vol. 68, no. 11 (published Nov 1982), pp. 785–7, PMID 6131504
- Ponte, P L; Randone, M (1967), "The Frenchman Antoine Beclere, pioneer of radiology and the Portuguese Egas Moniz, the first to perform arteriography", Minerva Med., vol. 58, no. 80 (published Oct 6, 1967), pp. 1248–9, PMID 4865589
