= Gustav Peter Bucky =

German radiologist

Gustav Bucky
- Born: September 3, 1880; Leipzig
- Died: February 19, 1963 (aged 82); New York City
- Known for: Bucky diaphragm
- Scientific career
- Fields: Radiology

Gustav Peter Bucky (September 3, 1880 (Note: Several sources list an 1899 birthdate, but this would mean that Bucky was in his early teens when he introduced the Bucky diaphragm.) - February 19, 1963) was a German-American radiologist who made early contributions to X-ray technique. The Bucky diaphragm and the subsequent Bucky-Potter grid, devices that prevent scattered X-ray particles from reaching the X-ray film, are named for him.

Bucky spent significant portions of his career in both Germany and the United States. He was close friends with Albert Einstein and shared a patent with him for a self-adjusting camera.

== Early life and career ==
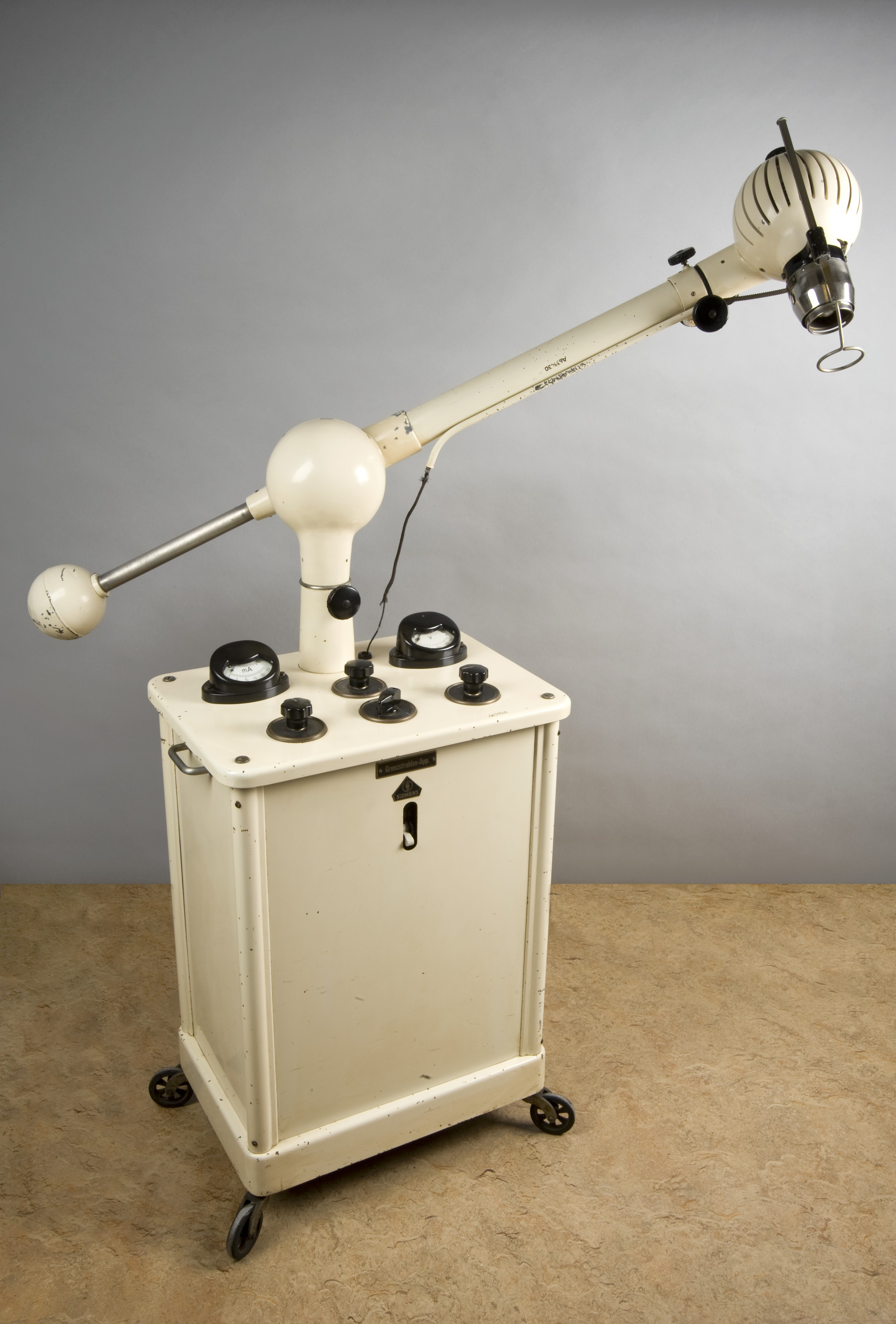
The Grenz ray machine, used for radiation therapy on the skin, was invented by Gustav Peter Bucky, who had discovered Grenz waves (low energy radiation waves) in 1925.

Bucky was born in Leipzig. He wanted to become an engineer, but his parents steered him toward medical school. He studied medicine in Geneva and Leipzig, graduating from medical school in 1906 after completing a thesis on the mechanisms of the movement of paratyphus from lymph and blood vessels to the gastrointestinal tract.

Since the mid-1890s, physicians had been struggling with a factor that limited the usefulness of X-rays: When X-ray particles hit part of a patient's body, secondary particles were released, scattered and hit the X-ray field, contributing to blurry X-ray images. In 1913, Bucky invented a system of two plates with grids on them. One plate was placed between the X-ray beam and the patient, and the other was placed between the patient and the film. The grids ensured that the secondary particles stayed in columns rather than scattering across the X-ray field. The Bucky diaphragm reduced the blur of X-ray images, but it caused grid lines to appear on the films.

Bucky made a presentation to the German Roentgen Society about his new invention and he secured patents in both the U.S. and Germany. Bucky came to the U.S. in 1923, and he was the seventh physician granted an honorary New York state medical license without being required to take the licensure examination. However, after World War I, forfeiture laws affected citizens of the Central Powers and caused Bucky to lose the rights to his patent, so he missed out on any earnings that he could have received for his invention of the Bucky diaphragm. An American radiologist, Hollis E. Potter, modified the grids from Bucky's invention, making them movable so that the lines did not show up on the X-ray image.

== Later career ==
In 1929, Bucky took a position in Germany as the radiology department head at Rudolf Virchow Hospital. Returning to the U.S. in 1933 for political reasons, he became close friends with Albert Einstein in the course of providing medical treatment to Einstein's wife Elsa. Einstein had also moved from Germany to the U.S. not long before that. Bucky tried to recoup some of his financial losses by patenting modifications of existing imaging technologies. He was often sued for patent infringement, and the normally private Einstein used his patent expertise to help Bucky out of these situations.

In 1935, Bucky and Einstein jointly filed a patent application for a camera that self-adjusted the amount of light that was let into the photographic plate. A few years later, Kodak introduced an automatic camera called the Super Six-20, but the two cameras operate on different principles. In June 1940, Bucky and his wife Frida were the signatory witnesses to Einstein's petition for naturalization requesting U.S. citizenship. Bucky and Einstein remained very close, and Bucky was present when Einstein was on his deathbed.

== Personal life ==
Bucky died in 1963 and he was survived by his wife Frida and two children. In 1967, Bucky's widow decided to auction off a collection of letters from Einstein to Gustav Bucky. One of Bucky's children, Peter A. Bucky, was preparing to write a memoir about the family's relationship with Einstein and he tried to buy the letters, but the collection sold for more than $35,000 and he was outbid.

Peter A. Bucky later published his memoir, titled The Private Albert Einstein. Frida Bucky, who had written several children's songs, lived until 1974, when she was 91 years old.
