= Grenz rays =

Low energy X-rays used in dermatology

Grenz rays are part of the electromagnetic spectrum comprising low energy (ultrasoft) X-rays. These were first investigated by Gustav Bucky in 1923 using a cathode vacuum tube with a lithium borate glass window, which he labeled Grenz rays as he believed that the biological effects resembled those of UV light and traditional X-rays and hence were on the border between the two (Grenz = border in German). These rays are also known as Bucky rays.

Grenz rays are produced by specially calibrated X-ray machines generally operating in the 10 to 30 kV range to produce X-rays with HVL less than 0.035 mm in aluminum. (HVL is half-value layer, and refers to a thickness of a given material that will cut the X-ray flux by 50%). Grenz rays are absorbed by air and therefore treatments must be given at fixed distances for which the machine has been calibrated. In human tissue Grenz rays have a half-value depth of 0.5 mm and are essentially absorbed within the first 2 mm of skin. The exact mechanism of action is unknown but it does have effects on the Langerhans cells in the epidermis.

== Uses ==
Grenz rays are indicated for treatment of eczema, psoriasis, palmoplantar pustulosis, neurodermatitis, pruritus ani and pruritus vulvae. They have been reported to be helpful for lichen planus, Grover's disease, Darier's disease, Hailey–Hailey disease and histiocytosis X. Grenz rays have also been used for treatment of actinic keratosis and Bowen's disease.

== See also ==
- Dermatitis
