= Orbital x-ray =

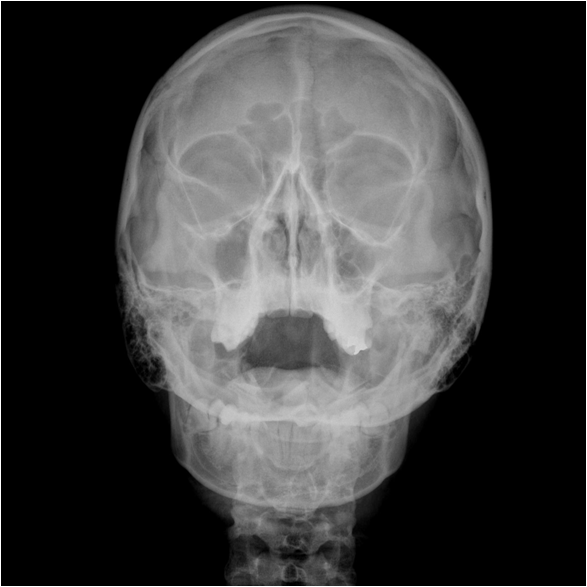
- Waters view showing diffuse prominent mucosal thickening in the right maxillary sinus and mild nmucosal thickening in the left maxillary sinus.
- ICD-10-PCS: B807ZZZ
- eMedicine: 383739
- LOINC: 36886-0

Orbital x-ray or orbital radiography is an x-ray of both left and right eye sockets, to include the Frontal Sinuses and Maxillary Sinuses.

== Positioning ==
The x-ray can be taken with the patient in either an erect or supine position, although most usually erect. The x-ray is taken PA (postero-antero), meaning that the patient faces towards the receiver and away from the x-rays source. The patients chin rests on the image receiver, which tilts the head up allowing the orbits to be clear of the internal structure of the Petrous ridge. This view is called Occipital-Mental or OM.

An orbital x-ray usually requires only one view unless the requester is looking for evidence of metallic fragments, in which case two projections can be made. One with the eyes looking up, one with the eyes looking down. These views will show any movement of fragments and helps rule out false positives / artefacts which may be present on the image receiver. Two other important views are the Water's view which helps visualise the anterior orbital floor and maxillary sinuses; and the Caldwell view which helps to visualise the frontal and ethmoid sinuses and posterior orbital floor.

== Uses ==
It is useful for detecting fractures of the surrounding bone arising from injury or disease. It is also commonly used for detecting foreign objects in the eye that an ophthalmoscope cannot detect and is sometimes given prior to an MRI where metal fragments could cause significant damage.
