= Anti-scatter grid =

Apparatus that filters scattered and incident radiation

Effect of an anti-scatter grid on incident beams.

In medical imaging, an anti-scatter grid (also known as a Bucky-Potter grid) is a device for limiting the amount of scattered radiation reaching the detector, thereby improving the quality of diagnostic medical x-ray images. The grid is positioned on the opposite side of the patient from the x-ray source, and between the patient and the X-ray detector or film. Reducing the amount of scattered x-rays increases the image's contrast resolution, and consequently the visibility of soft tissues.

== History ==
The device was first invented by German radiologist Gustav Peter Bucky, who showed in 1913 that a grid can be used to 'reject' scattered x-rays before they reach the detector. It was later improved by American radiologist Hollis E. Potter by introducing moving grid. The Bucky-Potter grid facilitated the transition from small glass photographic plates to film in a variety of sizes.

== Operation ==
Scattered x-rays do not travel in parallel to rays that pass directly through the patient. The quantity of scattering depends on several factors including: x-ray beam area, x-ray photon energies (determined by tube voltage setting), thickness of the tissue, and the composition of the tissue. By 'rejecting' scattered x-rays before they reach the detector, the Bucky-Potter grid improves recorded contrast.

The grid is constructed of a series of alternating parallel strips of lead and a radiolucent substance such as a plastic, carbon fibre, aluminium, even paper. The grid is placed between the patient and the detector during the exposure. Radiation which has travelled straight through the patient from the x-ray source moves directly through the radiolucent portions of the grid and strikes the detector. Radiation which has been scattered while travelling through the patient strikes the lead strips at an angle, and is either attenuated or further scattered. As a result, only radiation which has travelled directly through the patient is imaged on the detector, increasing contrast.

The single most important parameter that influences the performance of an anti-scatter grid is the grid ratio. The grid ratio is the ratio of the height to the width of the interspaces (not the grid bars) in the grid. Grid ratios of 8:1, 10:1, and 12:1 are most. A 5:1 grid is most common for mammography. The grid is essentially a one-dimensional Collimator and increasing the grid ratio increases the degree of collimation. Higher grid ratios provide better scatter cleanup, but they also result in greater radiation doses to the patient, as higher radiation doses are needed for the same amount of photons to reach the detector. In addition, though higher ratios are possible, they require greater radiation intensity increases when used, require more precise positioning, and are more expensive to produce.

== Drawbacks ==
Grids are used particularly in examinations where a large quantity of scatter is created, i.e., those involving a large volume of tissue being irradiated and those requiring low energy i.e. voltage. The scatter would otherwise degrade the image by reducing the contrast and resolution. Use of a grid, however, requires a greater radiation exposure to the patient as a good deal of primary beam is also attenuated by the lead slats, and for this reason grids are not used for all examinations, particularly in pediatric practice.

One drawback of a fixed radiographic grid is that it creates grid lines on the image. Hollis Potter (1880–1964) showed in 1920 that these grid lines could be eliminated by moving the grid at right angles to the grid lines during the exposure. If the range and speed of motion is sufficient, the grid lines will be blurred out. The motion may be oscillating, vibrating, or reciprocating and must be continuous and smooth. The motion must also begin before exposure and continue until after exposure.
