= Swerling =

Swerling is a surname that may refer to:

- Beverly Swerling (b. 1949), US historical fiction writer
- Jo Swerling (1897–1964), Ukraine-born US writer for songs, theatre and screen
- Lisa Swerling (b. 1972), a South African born writer, illustrator and sculptor
- Peter Swerling (1929–2000), a radar physicist

Swerling Target Models for radar targets are named after Peter Swerling.
