= Chi (letter) =

Twenty-second letter of the Greek alphabet

Chi (/kaɪ/ KY, also /xiː/ KHEE; uppercase Χ, lowercase χ; Greek: χῖ) is the twenty-second letter of the Greek alphabet.

The letter's origins are uncertain. Although its shape closely resembles the Phoenician letter taw 𐤕 (whence Greek tau Τ), it is believed to derive from a variant of kappa; its /kʰ/ sound value was represented with the digraphs ΚΗ and ϘΗ in the Southern Greek alphabet.

== Greek ==
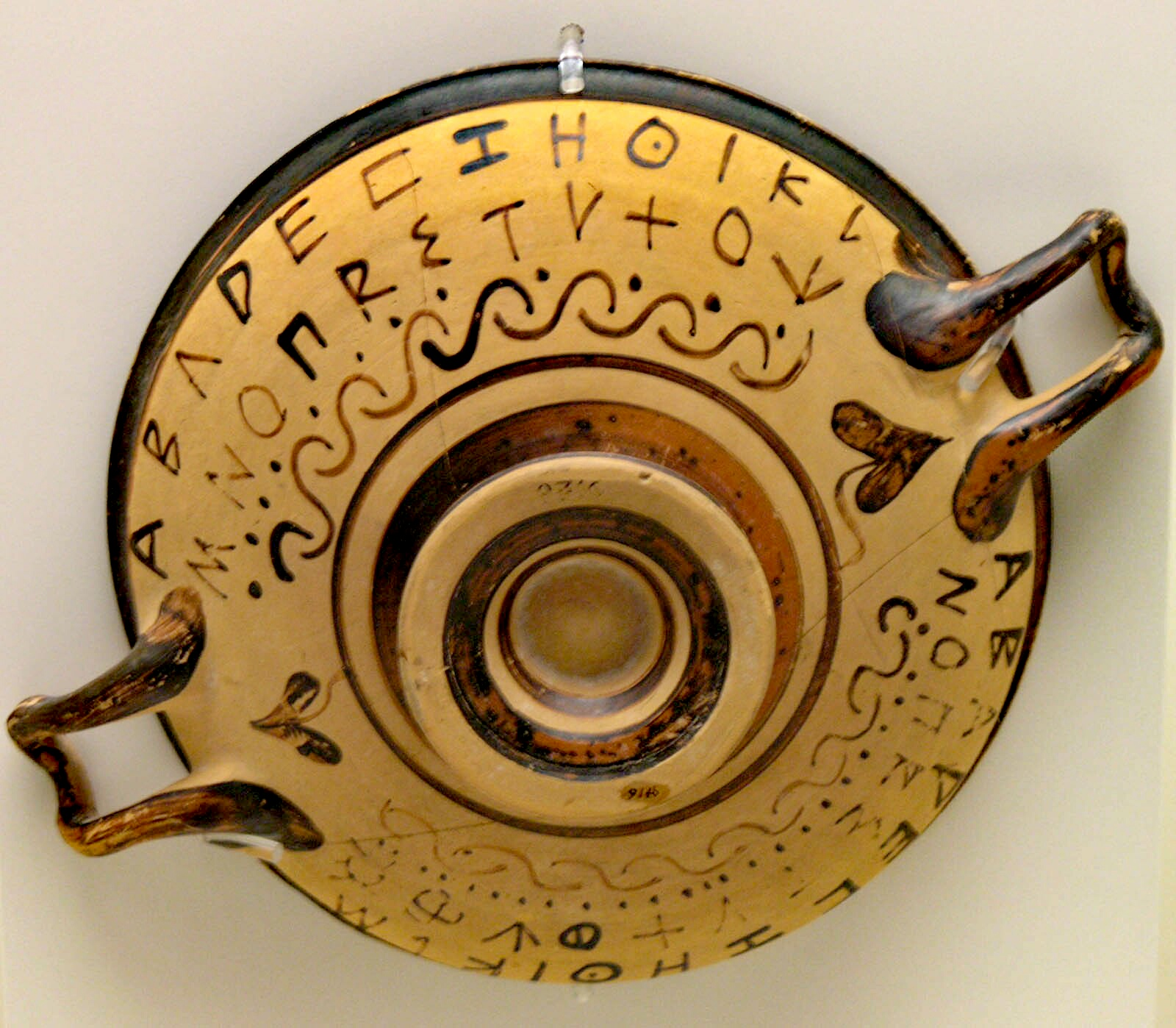
The Greek alphabet on a black figure vessel, with a cross-shaped chi

=== Pronunciation ===
==== Ancient Greek ====
Its value in Ancient Greek was originally an aspirated velar stop /kʰ/ (in the Western Greek alphabet: /ks/). It later became a fricative ([x]/[ç]) along with Θ and Φ.

==== Modern Greek ====
In Modern Greek, it has two distinct pronunciations: In front of high or front vowels (/e/ or /i/) it is pronounced as a voiceless palatal fricative [ç], which sounds similar to "h" in English words like hew and human and is equivalent to the German ich-Laut as in dich. In front of low or back vowels (/a/, /o/ or /u/) and consonants, it is pronounced as a voiceless velar fricative ([x]), like the German ach-Laut as in Bach or the Spanish j.

=== Transliteration ===
Chi is romanized as ⟨ch⟩ in most systematic transliteration conventions, but sometimes ⟨kh⟩ is used. In addition, in Modern Greek, it is often also romanized as ⟨h⟩ or ⟨x⟩ in informal practice.

=== Greek numeral ===
In the system of Greek numerals, it has a value of 600.

=== Xi ===
In ancient times, some local forms of the Greek alphabet used the chi instead of xi to represent the /ks/ sound. This was borrowed into the early Latin language, which led to the use of the letter X for the same sound in Latin, and many modern languages that use the Latin alphabet.

== Cyrillic ==
Chi was also included in the Cyrillic script as the letter Х, with the phonetic value /x/ or /h/.

== International Phonetic Alphabet ==
In the International Phonetic Alphabet, ⟨χ⟩ represents a voiceless uvular fricative.

== Chiasmus ==
Chi is the basis for the name literary chiastic structure and the name of chiasmus.

== Symbolism ==
In Plato's Timaeus, it is explained that the two bands that form the soul of the world cross each other like the letter Χ. Plato's analogy, along with several other examples of chi as a symbol occur in Thomas Browne's discourse The Garden of Cyrus (1658).

Chi or X is often used to abbreviate the name Christ, as in the holiday Christmas (Xmas). When fused within a single typeface with the Greek letter rho, it is called the Chi Rho and used to represent the person of Jesus Christ.

== Mathematics and science ==
- In statistics, the term chi-squared or $\chi^2$ has various uses, including the chi-squared distribution, the chi-squared test, and chi-squared target model
- In algebraic topology, Chi is used to represent the Euler characteristic of a surface.
- The chromatic number of a graph in graph theory
- In neuroanatomy, crossings of peripheral nerves (such as the optic chiasm) are named for the letter Chi because of its Χ-shape.
- In chemistry, the mole fraction and electronegativity may be denoted by the lowercase $\chi$.
- In physics, $\chi$ denotes electric or magnetic susceptibility.
- In rhetoric, both chiastic structure (a literary device) and the figure of speech Chiasmus derive from their names from the shape of the letter Chi.
- In mechanical engineering, chi is used as a symbol for the reduction factor of relevant buckling loads in the EN 1993, a European Standard for the design of steel structures.
- In analytic number theory, chi is used for the Dirichlet character.

== Unicode ==
- U+03A7 Χ GREEK CAPITAL LETTER CHI (&Chi;)
- U+03C7 χ GREEK SMALL LETTER CHI (&chi;)
- U+1D61 ᵡ MODIFIER LETTER SMALL CHI
- U+1D6A ᵪ GREEK SUBSCRIPT SMALL LETTER CHI
- U+2627 ☧ CHI RHO
- U+2CAC Ⲭ COPTIC CAPITAL LETTER KHI
- U+2CAD ⲭ COPTIC SMALL LETTER KHI
- U+2CE9 ⳩ COPTIC SYMBOL KHI RO
- U+A7B3 Ꭓ LATIN CAPITAL LETTER CHI
- U+AB53 ꭓ LATIN SMALL LETTER CHI
- U+AB54 ꭔ LATIN SMALL LETTER CHI WITH LOW RIGHT RING
- U+AB55 ꭕ LATIN SMALL LETTER CHI WITH LOW LEFT SERIF
- U+1D6BE 𝚾 MATHEMATICAL BOLD CAPITAL CHI
- U+1D6D8 𝛘 MATHEMATICAL BOLD SMALL CHI
- U+1D6F8 𝛸 MATHEMATICAL ITALIC CAPITAL CHI
- U+1D712 𝜒 MATHEMATICAL ITALIC SMALL CHI
- U+1D732 𝜲 MATHEMATICAL BOLD ITALIC CAPITAL CHI
- U+1D74C 𝝌 MATHEMATICAL BOLD ITALIC SMALL CHI
- U+1D76C 𝝬 MATHEMATICAL SANS-SERIF BOLD CAPITAL CHI
- U+1D786 𝞆 MATHEMATICAL SANS-SERIF BOLD SMALL CHI
- U+1D7A6 𝞦 MATHEMATICAL SANS-SERIF BOLD ITALIC CAPITAL CHI
- U+1D7C0 𝟀 MATHEMATICAL SANS-SERIF BOLD ITALIC SMALL CHI

== See also ==
- Chi (disambiguation)
- Х, х - Kha (Cyrillic)
