= History of the Greek alphabet =

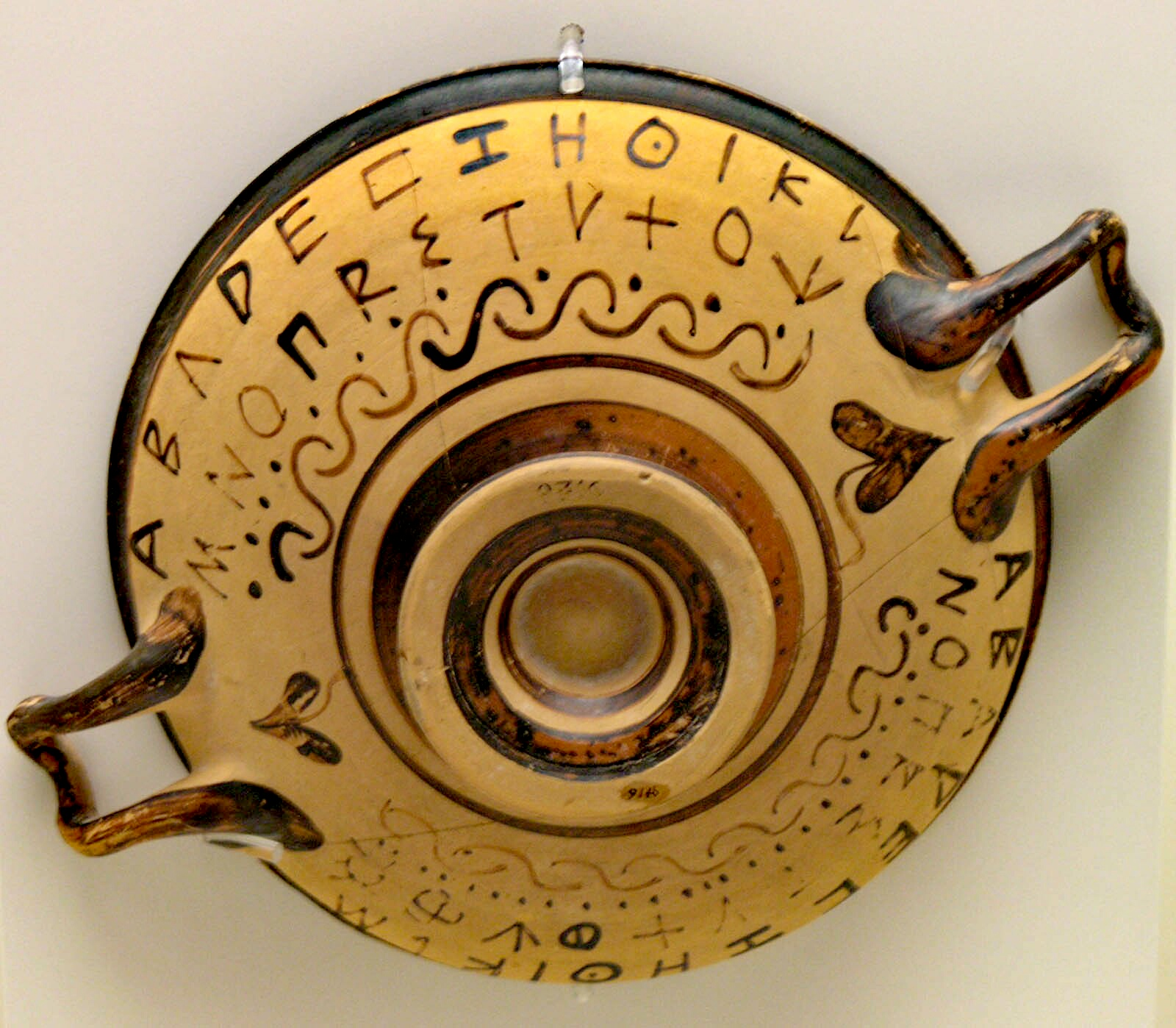
Black figure vessel with double alphabet inscription, showing new letters ΥΧ[Φ]Ψ, and ΥΧΦΨΩ.

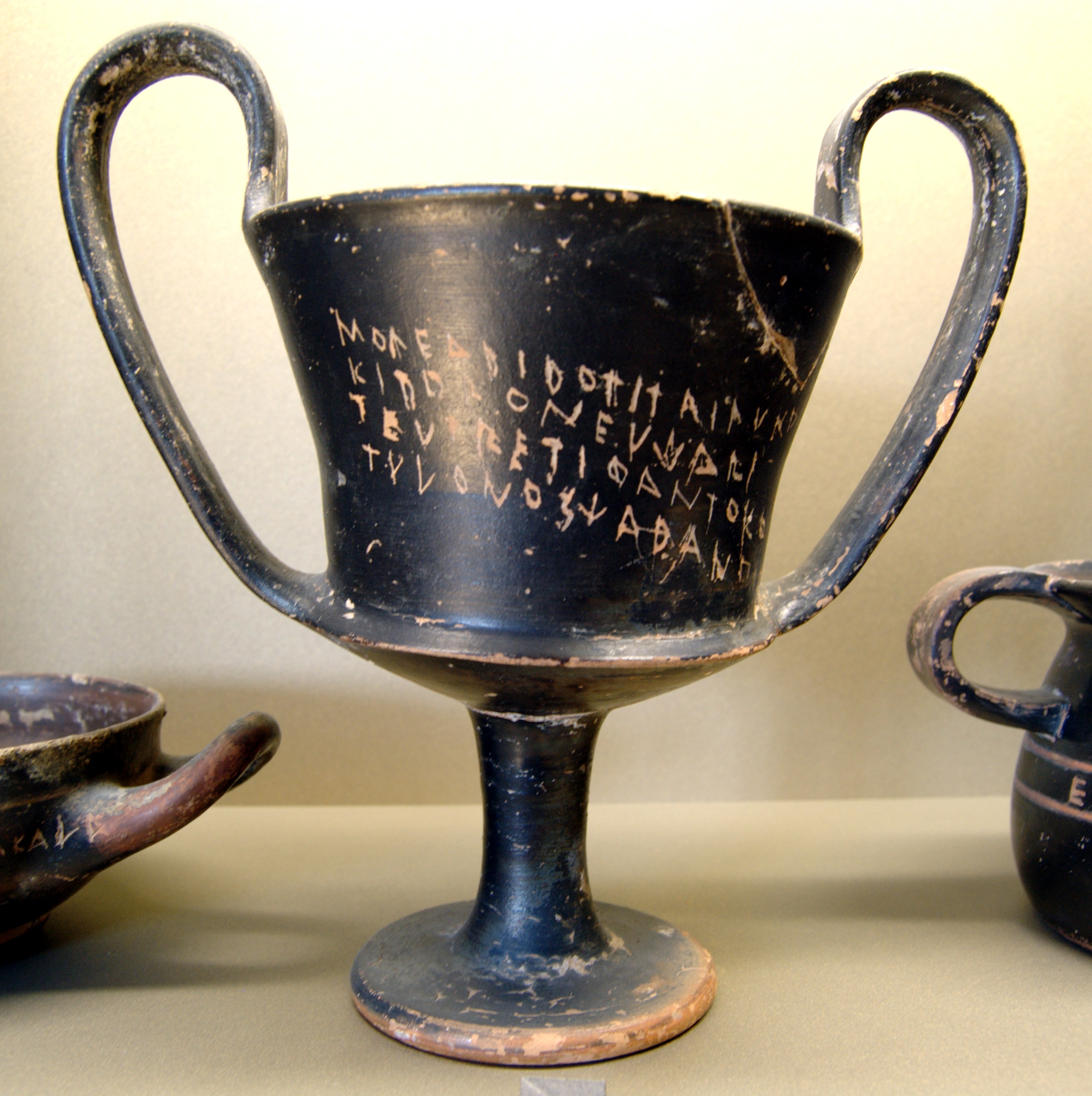
Dedication in Boeotian alphabet. Black-glaze Boeotian kantharos, 450–425 BC.

The history of the Greek alphabet began with the adoption of Phoenician letter forms in the 9th–8th centuries BC during early Archaic Greece and continues to the present day. The Greek alphabet was developed during the Iron Age, centuries after the loss of Linear B, the syllabic script that was used for writing Mycenaean Greek until the Late Bronze Age collapse and Greek Dark Age.

The Phoenician alphabet was consistently explicit about consonants. By the 9th century BC it had developed matres lectionis to indicate some, mostly final, vowels. This arrangement is much less suitable for Greek than for Semitic languages, and these matres lectionis, as well as several Phoenician letters which represented consonants not present in Greek, were adapted according to the acrophonic principle to represent Greek vowels consistently, if not unambiguously.

The Greek alphabet was developed by a Greek with first-hand experience of contemporary Phoenician script. After it was established in the Greek mainland, it was exported eastwards to Phrygia, where a similar script was devised. It was also exported westward with Euboean or West Greek traders, where the Etruscans adapted the Greek alphabet to their own language, which eventually led to the Latin alphabet.

== Chronology of adoption ==
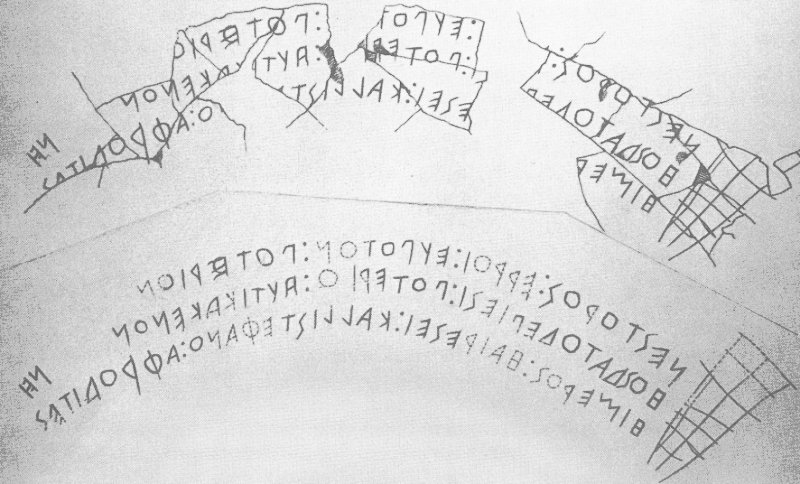
Nestor's Cup inscription, Euboean alphabet, 8th century BC

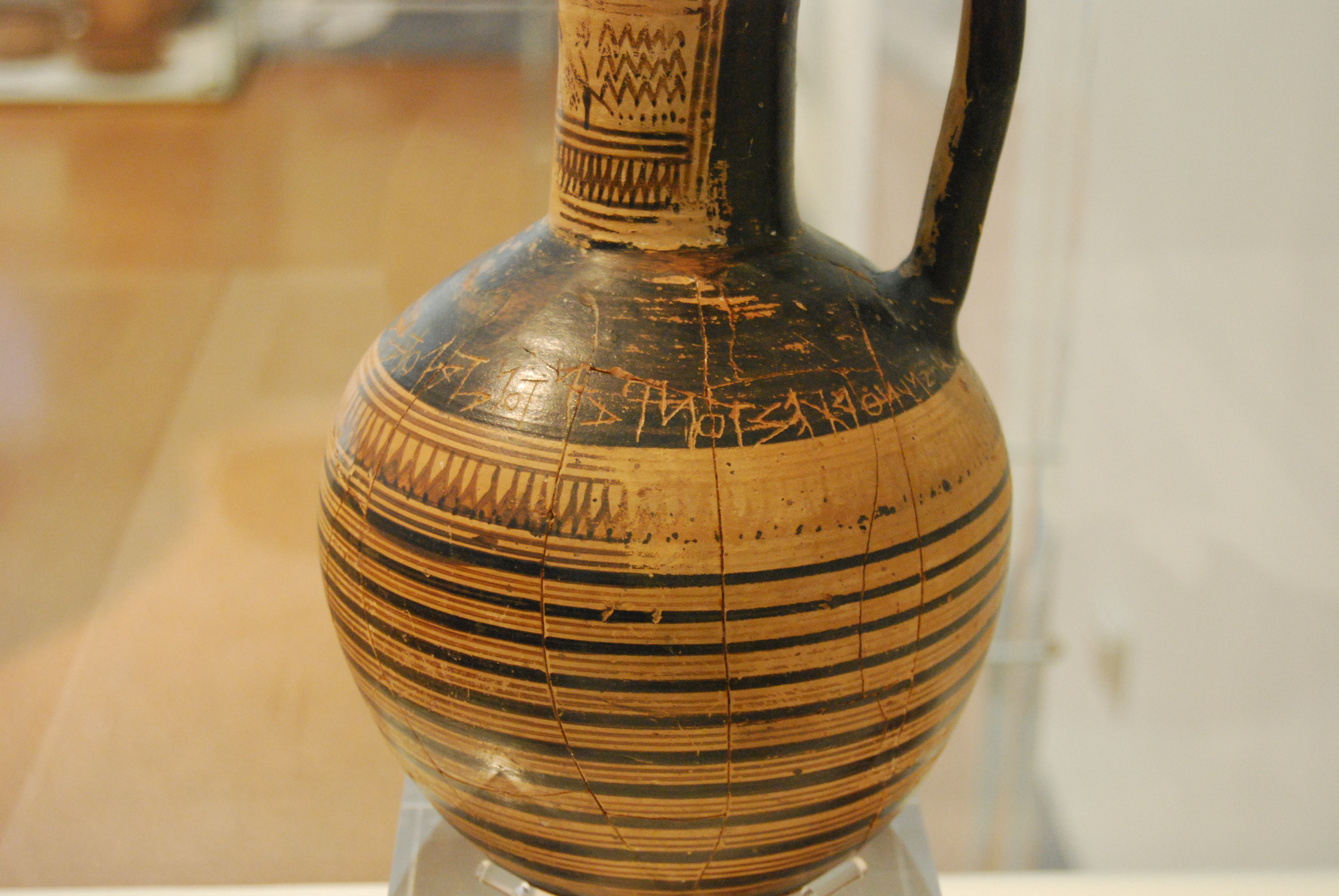
Dipylon inscription

Most specialists believe that the Phoenician alphabet was adopted for Greek during the early 8th century BC, perhaps in Euboea. The earliest known fragmentary Greek inscriptions date from this time, 770–750 BC, and they match Phoenician letter forms of c. 800–750 BC. The oldest substantial texts known to date are the Dipylon inscription and the text on the so-called Cup of Nestor, both dated to the late 8th century BC, inscriptions of personal ownership and dedications to a god.

Tradition recounts that a daughter of a certain Agamemnon, king of Aeolian Cyme, married a Phrygian king called Midas.

This link may have facilitated the Greeks "borrowing" their alphabet from the Phrygians because the Phrygian letter shapes are closest to the inscriptions from Aeolis.

Some scholars argue for earlier dates: Naveh (1973) for the 11th century BC, Stieglitz (1981) for the 14th century, Bernal (1990) for the 18th–13th century, some for the 9th, but none of these are widely accepted.

The Fayum alphabet, originating on Cyprus, seems to be older than the fragmentary Greek inscriptions: it is dated to c. 800 BC and appears to preserve the earliest known form of the Greek alphabet. This could indicate that the Phoenician alphabet was adapted to Greek on Cyprus, where an important Phoenician colony existed at the time in the city-kingdom of Kition; however, the Cypriot syllabary, which was already employed at the time to write the local dialect, having been in use since the 11th century, remained in use in Cyprus until the 4th century BC and was not replaced by the adapted Phoenician alphabet this early.

Another possibility is that the adaptation happened on Thera, which Herodotus and Pausanias claim to have been settled early by Phoenicians descending from Cadmus; however, a Phoenician presence on the island has not been proven archaeologically.

=== Herodotus' account ===
According to legends recounted by Herodotus, the alphabet was first introduced to Greece by a Phoenician named Cadmus:

The Phoenicians who came with Cadmus—amongst whom were the Gephyraei—introduced into Greece, after their settlement in the country, a number of accomplishments, of which the most important was writing, an art till then, I think, unknown to the Greeks. At first they [the Phoenicians] used the same characters as all the other Phoenicians, but as time went on, and they changed their language, they also changed the shape of their letters. At that period most of the Greeks in the neighbourhood were Ionians; they were taught these letters by the Phoenicians and adopted them, with a few alterations, for their own use, continuing to refer to them as the Phoenician characters—as was only right, as the Phoenicians had introduced them. The Ionians also call papyrus 'skins'—a survival from antiquity when papyrus was hard to get, and they did actually use goat and sheep skins to write on. Indeed, even today many foreign peoples use this material. In the temple of Ismenian Apollo at Theba in Boeotia I have myself seen cauldrons with inscriptions cut on them in Cadmean characters—most of them not very different from the Ionian.

Herodotus estimates that Cadmus lived sixteen hundred years earlier, or around 2000 BC. He had seen and described the Cadmean writing engraved on certain tripods in the temple of Apollo at Thebes. He estimated that those tripods dated back to the time of Laius, the great-grandson of Cadmus. On one of the tripods there was this inscription in Cadmean writing, which as he attested, resembled Ionian letters: Ἀμφιτρύων μ᾽ ἀνέθηκ᾽ ἐνάρων ἀπὸ Τηλεβοάων ("Amphitryon dedicated me from the spoils of [the battle of] Teleboae."). A second tripod bears the inscription in hexameter verse: Σκαῖος πυγμαχέων με ἑκηβόλῳ Ἀπόλλωνι νικήσας ἀνέθηκε τεῒν περικαλλὲς ἄγαλμα. ("Scaeus the boxer, victorious in the contest, dedicated me to Apollo, the archer god, a lovely offering"). Herodotus estimated that if Scaeus, the son of Hippocoon was the dedicator and not another of the same name, he would have lived at the time of Oedipus. The third tripod bears the inscription again in hexameter verse: Λαοδάμας τρίποδ᾽ αὐτὸς ἐυσκόπῳ Ἀπόλλωνι μουναρχέων ἀνέθηκε τεῒν περικαλλὲς ἄγαλμα. ("Laodamas, while he reigned, dedicated this cauldron to Apollo, the sure of aim, as a lovely offering").

=== Hyginus' account ===
Hyginus recounts the following legends about the development of the alphabet:

The three Fates created the first five vowels of the alphabet and the letters B and T. It is said that Palamedes, son of Nauplius invented the remaining eleven consonants. Then Hermes reduced these sounds to characters, showing wedge shapes because cranes fly in wedge formation and then carried the system from Greece to Egypt*. This was the Pelasgian alphabet, which Cadmus had later brought to Boeotia, then Evander of Arcadia, a Pelasgian, introduced into Italy, where his mother, Carmenta, formed the familiar fifteen characters of the Latin alphabet. Other consonants have since been added to the Greek alphabet. Alpha was the first of eighteen letters, because alphe means honor, and alphainein is to invent.

=== Diodorus' account ===
Some ancient Greek scholars argued that the Greek alphabet should not be attributed to the Phoenician alphabet. Diodorus Siculus in his Historical Library, Book 5, suggests that the Phoenicians merely "changed the form and shape" of earlier letters:

But there are some who attribute the invention of letters to the Syrians, from whom the Phoenicians learned them and communicated them to the Greeks when they came with Cadmus into Europe; hence the Greeks called them Phoenician letters. To these that hold this opinion, it is answered that the Phoenicians were not the first that found out letters, but only changed the form and shape of them into other characters, which many afterwards using the name of Phoenicians grew to be common.

=== Plutarch's account ===
In his essay "On the Malice of Herodotus", Plutarch criticizes Herodotus for prejudice and misrepresentation. Furthermore, he argues that Gephyraei were Euboeans or Eretrians and he doubts the reliability of Herodotus' sources.

As for Aristogeiton, Herodotus puts him not forth at the back door, but thrusts him directly out of the gate into Phoenicia, saying that he had his origins from the Gephyraei, and that the Gephyraei were not, as some think, Euboeans or Eretrians, but Phoenicians, as himself has learned by report.

Plutarch and other ancient Greek writers credited the legendary Palamedes of Nauplion on Euboea with the invention of the supplementary letters not found in the original Phoenician alphabet. The distinction between Eta and Epsilon and between Omega and Omicron, adopted in the Ionian standard, was traditionally attributed to Simonides of Ceos (556–469).

Plutarch goes further back to describe an older Greek writing system, similar as he attested to the Egyptian writing. In his "Discourse Concerning Socrates's Daemon", he describes how Agesilaus king of Sparta, uncovers Alcmene's tomb at Haliartus and discovers a brazen plate on which a very ancient script was written, much older than the Ancient Greek alphabet. Agesilaus sent a transcript to Egypt in order to be translated back into Ancient Greek. Agetoridas the Spartan travelled to Memphis of Egypt and gave the transcript to Chonouphis the Egyptian priest. Some scholars speculate that this plate was written in Linear B. Agesilaus' decision to have text sent to Egypt is not unreasonable; it is widely accepted that Ancient Egyptians during the 4th century BC were able to translate to and from various other languages; they used three different writing systems within Egypt: hieroglyphic script, hieratic and demotic; this tradition continued during the Hellenistic period when all kinds of scripts were translated and copies were added to the library of Alexandria; one example today of a script written in three forms is the Rosetta Stone that appears in three texts: in ancient Egyptian hieroglyphs, in Egyptian demotic, and in ancient Greek. And therefore, as the story goes, the Egyptian priest, having studied the script and translated it, concluded that the writing enjoined the Greeks to institute games in honor of the Muses.

== Restructuring of the Phoenician abjad ==
Phoenician and Greek alphabets
Phoenician		Greek	
𐤀	alp	Α	alpha
𐤁	bet	Β	beta
𐤂	gaml	Γ	gamma
𐤃	dalt	Δ	delta
𐤄	he	Ε	epsilon
𐤅	waw	Ϝ	digamma
𐤅	waw	Υ	upsilon
𐤆	zen	Ζ	zeta
𐤇	ḥet	Η	heta
𐤈	ṭet	Θ	theta
𐤉	yod	Ι	iota
𐤊	kap	Κ	kappa
𐤋	lamd	Λ	lambda
𐤌	mem	Μ	mu
𐤍	nun	Ν	nu
𐤎	samk	Ξ	xi
𐤏	en	Ο	omicron
𐤏	en	Ω	omega
𐤐	pe	Π	pi
𐤑	tsade	Ϻ	san
𐤒	qop	Ϙ	koppa
𐤓	rosh	Ρ	rho
𐤔	shin	Σ	sigma
𐤕	taw	Τ	tau
		Φ	phi
		Χ	chi
		Ψ	psi

The majority of the letters of the Phoenician alphabet were adopted into Greek with much the same sounds as they had had in Phoenician. However, Phoenician, like other Semitic scripts, has a range of consonants, commonly called gutturals, that did not exist in Greek: alp [ʔ], he [h, e, a], het [ħ], and en [ʕ]. Of these, only ḥet was retained in Greek as a consonant, heta, representing the [h] sound in those dialects that had an [h], while the consonants alp, he and en became the vowels alpha [a], e [e] and o [o], respectively. (Note: Some of the modern names of the Greek letters date from a much later period.)

Phoenician had foreshadowed the development of vowel letters with a limited use of matres lectionis, that is, consonants that pulled double duty as vowels, which for historical reasons occurred mostly at the ends of words. For example, the two letters waw and yod stood for both the approximant consonants [w] and [j], and the long vowels [u] and [i] in Phoenician. By this point in time, Greek had lost its [j] sound, so Phoenician yod was used for its vocalic value, becoming the Greek vowel letter iota [i]. Several Greek dialects preserved a [w] sound, and here waw was used for both of its Phoenician values, but with different forms: as the Greek letter digamma for the consonant [w], and as the letter upsilon for the vowel [u]. Upsilon was added at the end of the alphabet, perhaps to avoid upsetting the alphabetic order that was used in Greek numerals. Phoenician he had been used as a mater lectionis for both [a] and [e] in addition to [h], but in Greek it was restricted to [e], following the acrophonic principle; its value [a] was instead written with the letter alp, while Greek [h] was written with ḥet.

All Phoenician letters had been acrophonic, and they remained so in Greek. Since the names of the letters alp and he were pronounced [alepʰ] and [e] by the Greeks, with initial vowels due to the silent gutturals (the disambiguation e psilon "narrow e" came later), the acrophonic principle was retained for vowels as well as consonants by using them for the Greek vowel sounds [a] and [e]. Only the letter en for [o] necessitated a change of name (o, later omicron).

The Phoenician consonants kap and qop represented sounds that were not distinctive in Greek—at most, they may have been identified with allophones determined by the following vowel. The letter koppa was used in certain Greek dialects (notably the western dialects, which ultimately gave rise to Etruscan and eventually the Latin alphabet), but elsewhere dropped out of general use. It is possible that koppa had been assigned to the Ancient Greek /kʷʰ/, and when that sound shifted to /pʰ/, the letter koppa continued as the letter phi.

Phoenician had three letters, samk, tsade, and shin, representing three or probably four voiceless sibilant sounds, whereas Greek only required one. The notation of the [s] sound varied between tsade and shin. The letter now known as sigma took its name from samk but its form from shin, while the letter San, which occurred in a few dialects only, took its name from shin but its place in the alphabet from tsade. A further Greek letter of uncertain origin, sampi, is found occasionally, and may represent an affricate, such as [t͡s].

== Epichoric alphabets ==
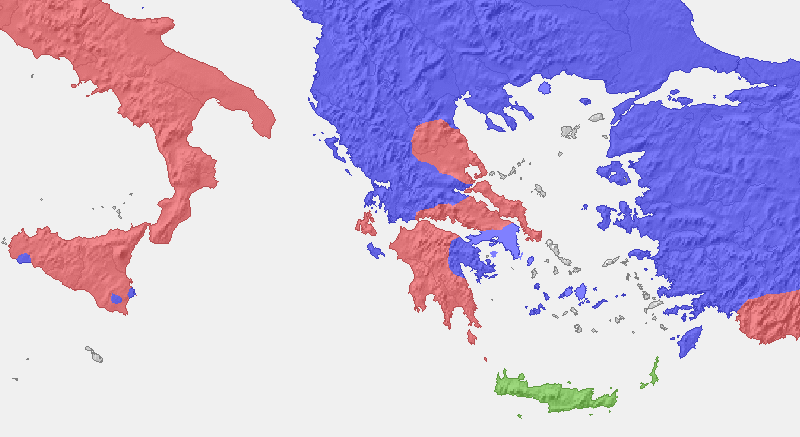
Distribution of epichoric alphabets after Kirchhoff (1887) Western, Cumae or Euboean alphabet Ionic, Attic and Corinthian Cretan

In the 8th to 6th centuries, local or epichoric variants of the alphabet developed. They are classified into three main groups, following Adolf Kirchhoff (1887): green (Cretan), red (Euboean or Western) and blue (Ionic, Attic and Corinthian). The main distinction is in the supplemental signs added to the Phoenician core inventory.

With the exception of the early Fayum alphabet, which does not fit into the tripartite scheme, all abecedaries add Υ to the Phoenician inventory. The green alphabets have only this; the red add Φ for [pʰ], Χ for [kʰ], and Ψ for [ks]; and the blue add Φ for [pʰ], and Χ for [kʰ], with a dark blue subgroup (Corinth and Rhodes) also having Ψ for [ps].

== Additional letters ==
In some, but not all, Greek dialects, additional letters were created to represent aspirated versions of Κ and Π (an aspirated version of Τ already existed as described above) and combinations of Κ and Π with Σ. There was some variation between dialects as to the symbols used:

- [kʰ] could be Κ, ΚΗ, Ψ, or Χ
- [pʰ] could be Π, ΠΗ, or Φ
- [ks] could be ΚΣ, ΧΣ, Χ, or Ξ
- [ps] could be ΠΣ, ΦΣ, or Ψ

Because [ks] and [ps] were the only consonant clusters occurring at the end of syllables, some gave them their own letters, Χ or Ξ and Ψ, so that all syllables would end in a single consonant letter, rather than seemingly have two exceptions in spelling.

Greek, like Phoenician, made a distinction for vowel length; indeed, Greek had five short vowels and seven long vowels, but only five vowel letters. As in Phoenician, the difference in length was not originally made in writing. However, by the 6th century BC the letter eta (not needed for a consonant in eastern dialects of Greek, which lacked [h]) came to stand for the long vowel [ɛː], and a new letter, omega, was developed for long [ɔː]. The provenance of omega is not known, but it is generally assumed to derive from omicron with a line drawn under it. Long [eː] and [oː] were written with the digraphs ει and ου, respectively, whereas long and short [a], [i], [u] were never distinguished in writing.

== Standardization – the Ionic alphabet ==
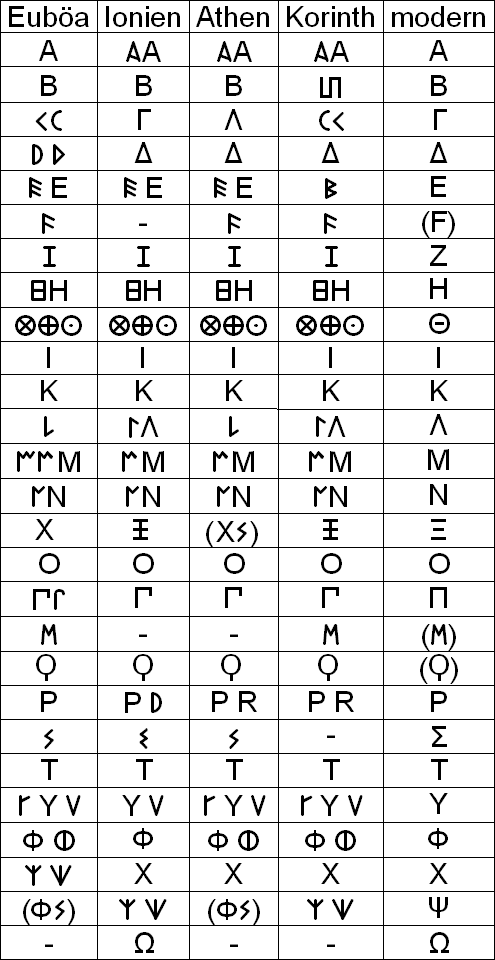
Variations of ancient Greek alphabets

In 403/2 BC, following the devastating defeat in the Peloponnesian War and the restoration of democracy, the Athenians voted to abandon the old Attic alphabet (Pre-Euclidean alphabet) and to introduce a standardized variant of the eastern Ionic alphabet, after a proposal by archon Eucleides. This Euclidean alphabet included eta and omega, which concluded the process of adapting the Phoenician script so that all vowels could be written systematically, thus becoming the first 'true' alphabet. Apparently, some thirty years later, the same alphabet was introduced to Boeotia, having been adopted perhaps a little earlier in Macedonia, and went on in the course of the 4th century to displace the local alphabets throughout the whole Greek-speaking world.

The Ionic alphabet included a new letter, omega, at the end of the alphabet, and standardised the representation of various sounds that had varied from one dialect to another, as follows:

Sound	Old Attic	Ionic
[h]	Η	(no symbol)
[ɛː]	Ε	Η (eta)
[eː]	Ε or ΕΙ	ΕΙ
[ɔː]	Ο	Ω (omega)
[oː]	Ο or ΟΥ	ΟΥ
[kʰ]	Χ	Χ (chi)
[pʰ]	Φ	Φ (phi)
[ks]	ΧΣ	Ξ (xi)
[ps]	ΦΣ	Ψ (psi)

The absence of a letter for [h] was of no consequence for the Ionic dialects, but sometimes led to ambiguities in Attic, which had retained the sound. A symbol based on the left-hand half (Ͱ) of the letter Η was therefore sometimes used to indicate the presence of [h] where necessary, and its absence was indicated by a symbol based on the right half.

During the classical period, ΕΙ came to be pronounced [iː] and ΟΥ came to be pronounced [uː], Υ having meanwhile moved to [y].

By about 200 BC, a system of diacritical marks was invented, representing the tone accents in use in Ancient Greek. This also helped to indicate the length of the vowels Α, Ι, and Υ in certain cases (for instance a circumflex can only occur on a long vowel), but Greek orthography has never had a comprehensive way of indicating vowel length, and this distinction has in any case been lost in Modern Greek. This innovation of accents, as well as that of punctuation marks, has been credited to Aristophanes of Byzantium (257 – c. 185 BC).

== Later developments ==
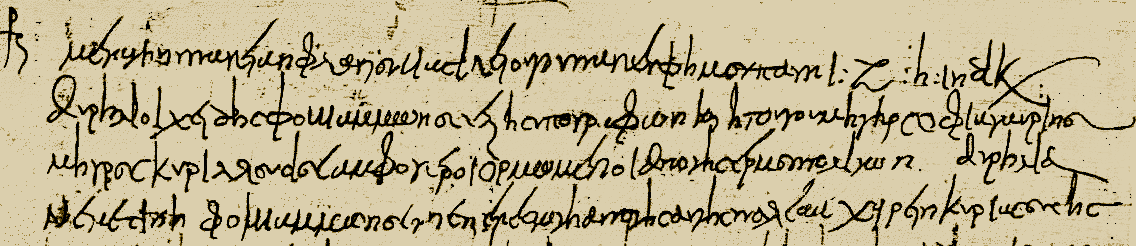
Cursive script, from a 6th-century private contract written on papyrus

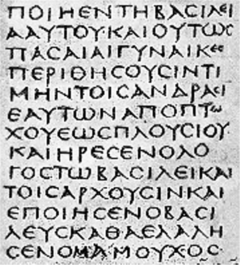
Uncial script, from a 4th-century Bible manuscript

By the time of late antiquity and the early Byzantine period, two different styles of handwriting had developed, both suitable to the act of writing with quill and ink on soft materials (papyrus or parchment). The uncial script consisted of large upright letter glyphs, similar to those used in inscriptions on stone and to the modern uppercase glyphs. It was used mainly for carefully produced book manuscripts. For other types of writing, for instance private letters, documents and other types of everyday writing, a cursive script had developed that used slanted, interconnected glyphs and many ligatures.

From the mid-9th century AD onwards, the uncial script was replaced in book writing by a new writing style, the Greek minuscule, which used more compact, rounded letter shapes and was partly based on the earlier cursive. This innovation may have centered on the scribal work of the Stoudion monastery in Constantinople. The earliest type of books written in minuscule, dated from the mid-9th to mid-10th century, are called codices vetustissimi ('oldest codices'). During the following centuries, this style of writing was further developed and took on more cursive elements again. This became the dominant type of handwriting until the post-Byzantine period.

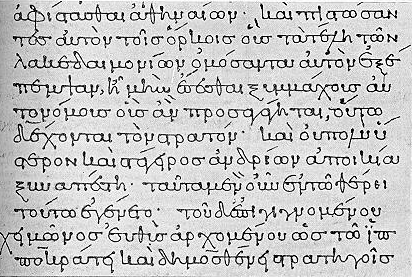
Earliest type of minuscule writing, from a 10th-century manuscript of Thucydides

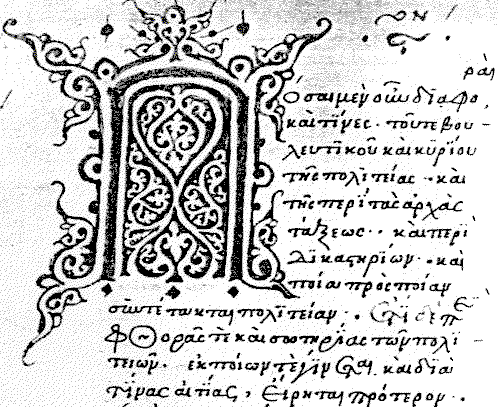
Later minuscule, 15th-century manuscript of Aristotle

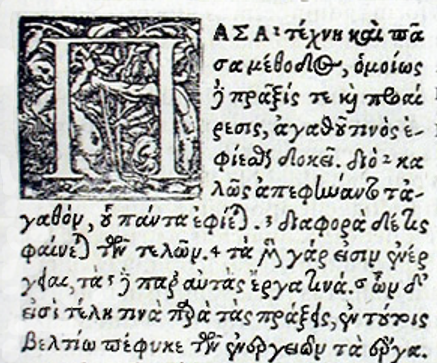
Early print, from a 1566 edition of Aristotle

Together with the minuscule letter shapes, Greek writing also began to use word-boundary spaces and diacritics (i.e. the accent marks and breathings of polytonic orthography) more regularly. Some punctuation began also to be employed. The iota subscript was employed from the 13th century onwards.

Often, in medieval manuscripts, old uncial letter forms were mixed in with the normal minuscule letters for writing titles or for emphasizing the initial letter of a word or sentence. Like in Latin, this became the root of the modern innovation of letter case, the systematic distinction between uppercase and lowercase letters in orthography. The uppercase letters of modern orthography are derived from the uncial script, while the lowercase letters are derived from minuscules.

The invention of printing saw the codification of a more fixed set of letter structures. Greek handwriting made extensive use of ligatures with letters written differently depending on their place in the word. Early printers, such as Aldus Manutius and Claude Garamond, attempted to imitate this, basing their printing on the writing of Greek scribes, producing a style text similar to modern italics. As Greece was occupied by the Ottoman Empire until the nineteenth century, early printers of (mostly ancient) Greek were mostly based in western Europe; few were Greek. This led to the adoption of writing conventions for Greek such as letter case influenced by printing and developments in the Latin alphabet. Cursive-inspired Greek print slowly disappeared during the eighteenth and nineteenth centuries in favour of an upright and less ornamented style of writing more like Latin print.

In 1708, the Palaeographia Graeca was published by Bernard de Montfaucon, who studied so thoroughly the Greek style of paleography that his book became the authority on the subject for the next two centuries.

In 1982, the monotonic orthography was officially adopted, abandoning the rough and smooth breathings (since the [h] sound had long since disappeared) and reducing the three types of accent mark to one (since the tone accent had been replaced by a stress accent).

Greek pronunciation has also changed considerably since ancient times, but these changes have not been apparent from the orthography, which has remained conservative – see Greek alphabet for a summary of the current situation.

== Names of the letters ==
The names of some letters were changed in order to distinguish them from certain digraphs which had become homophonous, as follows: (Note: See further LSJ, s.v. ψιλός §VI.)

Letter	Original name	Later name	Meaning
Ε	ei	epsilon	"plain [e̞]" as opposed to ⟨αι⟩ [e̞] (they had merged in the 3rd-1st centuries BC)
Ϝ	probably wau	digamma	The name "digamma" reflects its shape rather than its sound.
Ο	o or ou	omicron	"small [o̞]" as opposed to ⟨ω⟩ [o̞] (merged with the loss of vocal length/pitch from 3rd BC to 3rd AD)
Υ	u	upsilon	"plain [y]" as opposed to ⟨οι⟩ [y] (which had gone from [oi] to [ø] and in/by 1st AD merged with ⟨υ⟩)
Ω	ō	omega	"large [o̞]" as opposed to ⟨ο⟩ [o̞] (as above)
Ϡ		sampi	the name sampi means "like pi", similar to the name "digamma" reflecting its shape, suggesting that its phonetic use had been forgotten.

== Greek numerals ==
The letters of the alphabet were used in the system of Greek numerals. For this purpose the letters digamma and qoppa (but not san) were retained although they had gone out of general use, and the obscure letter sampi was added at the end of the alphabet. Digamma was often replaced in numerical use by stigma (Ϛ), originally a ligature of sigma and tau, or even the sequence sigma-tau (στ').

== Diffusion ==
The Old Italic and Anatolian alphabets are, like the Greek alphabet, attested from the 8th century BC. The Old Italic scripts trace their lineage from the Euboean variant of the Greek script, which was different from the Ionian alphabet still used today.

== See also ==
- Linear A

== Bibliography ==
- Bernal, Martin (1990), Cadmean Letters: The Transmission of the Alphabet to the Aegean and Further West Before 1400 BC, Eisenbrauns, ISBN 0-931464-47-1
- Peter T Daniels and William Bright, The World's Writing Systems, Oxford University Press, 1996, ISBN 0-19-507993-0, especially Section 21 "Transmission of the Phoenician Script to the West" (Pierre Swiggers) and Section 22 "The Greek Alphabet" (Leslie Threatte).
- Lilian Hamilton "Anne" Jeffery, The local scripts of archaic Greece: a study of the origin of the Greek alphabet and its development from the eighth to the fifth centuries B.C., Oxford, 1961, ISBN 0-19-814061-4. The standard reference.
- P. Kyle McCarter Jr., The antiquity of the Greek alphabet and the early Phoenician scripts, Harvard Semitic monographs, 1975. ISBN 0-89130-066-X.
- ———————— (1996), "The Early Diffusion of the Greek Alphabet", in Macrakis, Michael S (ed.), Greek letters: from tablets to pixels (proceedings of a Greek Font Society conference), Oak Knoll Press, ISBN 1-884718-27-2.
- ———————— (Winter 1998), "Who Invented the Alphabet: A Different View", Archaeological Odyssey, 1 (1)
- Joseph Naveh, "Some Semitic epigraphical considerations in the antiquity of the Greek alphabet", American journal of archaeology 77: 1-8 (1973). Argues for an earlier date of transmission.
- ———————— (1988), "The origin of the Greek alphabet", in de Kerckhove, Derrick; Lumsden, Charles J (eds.), The alphabet and the brain: The lateralization of writing, pp. 84–91.
- Ruijgh, CJ (1998), "Sur la date de la création de l'alphabet grec", Mnemosyne, 51 (6): 658–87, doi:10.1163/1568525981569785.
- Robert R. Stieglitz, "The Letters of Kadmos: Mythology, Archaeology, and Eteocretan", Pepragmena tou Diethnous Kretologikou Synedriou (Herakleio, 29 August – 3 September 1976), Athens, 1981.
