= Fayum alphabet =

Ancient Greek abecedary, c. 800 BCE

The Fayum alphabet is an Ancient Greek abecedary inscribed on four copper plates, purportedly found in Fayum, Egypt but made in Cyprus. It may preserve the earliest form of the Greek alphabet. It is the only known Greek abecedary which ends in the letter tau (Τ), as does the ancestral Phoenician alphabet; all other Greek abecedaries have at least the addition of non-Phoenician upsilon (Υ).

== See also ==
- History of the Greek alphabet
- Dipylon inscription
