= Technology Service Corporation =

American engineering company

Technology Service Corporation (TSC)
- Type: Private
- Founded: Santa Monica, California, United States (1966)
- Founders: Peter Swerling
- Successors: Falcata
- Headquarters: Arlington, Virginia
- Key people: Brandon Wolfson (President and CEO)
- Products: Electronics; Engineering services
- Revenue: US$182.8 million
- Number of employees: 526
- Website: tsc.com falcata.com

Technology Service Corporation (TSC) is an American engineering company headquartered in Arlington, Virginia, providing services and specialized products to the U.S. government agencies and private industry. On 1 October 2026, Blackstone announced that it had funded acquisitions of TSC and Applied Systems Engineering, Inc. (ASEI) to form a new defense technology company, Falcata.

== History ==
In 1966, Technology Service Corporation was founded in Santa Monica, California by Peter Swerling. The firm made an IPO in 1983, and then was acquired by Westinghouse Electric Corporation in 1985. Spun off from Westinghouse, it became an employee-owned company in 1993.

== Current business ==
TSC's current customers include the U.S. Department of Defense, the Federal Aviation Administration, international civil aviation agencies, and radar system suppliers. The company's sensor systems include primary and secondary radars and weather radars; it engages in prototype development, circuit board manufacture, geographic information systems, and computer applications for simulation and radar siting; it also produces microwave test equipment. TSC provides consulting engineering services in modeling and testing, systems engineering, and procurement and deployment.

As of 2024, estimated current annual revenue was US$182.8 million, up from US$125.6 million in 2023; the company had approximately 526 employees.

In partnership with the Air Force Research Laboratory, Technology Service Corporation developed the Sea Dragon system, a tracking system to document illegal maritime fishing. The system uses synthetic aperture radar and video imaging mounted on inexpensive commercial aircraft such as the Cessna 337.

In 2008, the company's then-CFO, Michael Syracuse, received a Washington Business Journal Award for Financial Excellence in the Government Contracting (Less than $500 Million) category; the award recognizes "competent, confident and ethical financial professionals" who have done exceptional work in their field.

In 2018, Brandon Wolfson was named President and CEO. Wolfson was named CEO and Director of the successort company Falcata. At the time of the acquisition and formation of Falcata, TSC characterized some of its market areas as radar and fire control, space and airborne systems, missile and air defense, and electronic warfare.

== Locations ==
The company is headquartered in Arlington, Virginia; it was previously located in Silver Spring, Maryland. As of 2014, additional locations included three offices in the Washington metropolitan area; two offices elsewhere in Virginia; Huntsville, Alabama; Colorado Springs, Colorado; Los Angeles, California; Scottsdale, Arizona; Trumbull, Connecticut; and Bloomington, Indiana. The facility in Dahlgren, Virginia, supporting contracting for the Naval Surface Warfare Center and the Missile Defense Agency, was recently expanded.

== Peter Swerling Award ==
TSC recognizes its founder by granting the Peter Swerling Award for Entrepreneurial Excellence to select employees who have made significant contributions to the growth and success of the company.
