= Chi-square =

The term chi-square, chi-squared, or $\chi^2$ has various uses in statistics:

- chi-square distribution, a continuous probability distribution
- chi-square test, name given to some tests using chi-square distribution
- chi-square target models, a mathematical model used in radar cross-section
