= Jo Swerling Jr. =

American director, producer and screenwriter

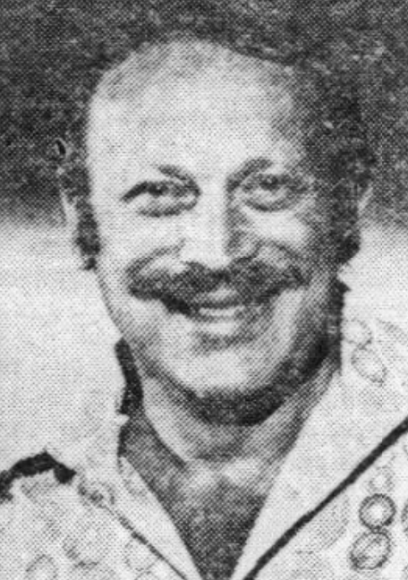
- Swerling in 1975
- Born: June 18, 1931 (age 95); Los Angeles, California, U.S.
- Occupations: Producer, screenwriter
- Parent: Jo Swerling (father)
- Relatives: Peter Swerling (brother)

Jo Swerling Jr. (born June 18, 1931) is an American director, producer and screenwriter. He was nominated for four Primetime Emmy Awards in the categories Outstanding Drama Series and Outstanding Limited Series for his work on the television programs Run for Your Life, Baretta, Captains and the Kings and Wiseguy.

The company initially worked for Universal Television until 1981 when he joined Stephen J. Cannell Productions there.
