= Jo Swerling =

American dramatist

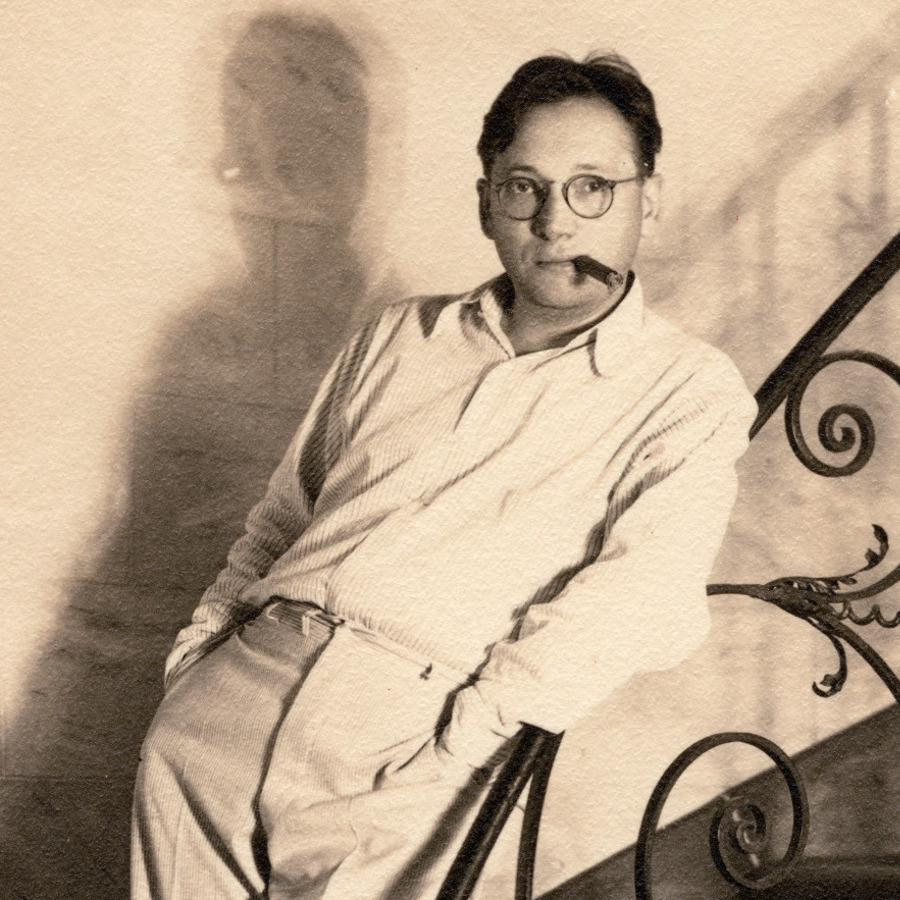
Jo Swerling, circa 1940.

Jo Swerling (April 8, 1897 – October 23, 1964) was an American theatre writer, lyricist, and screenwriter.

== Early life ==
Born Joseph Swerling (Цверлингъ, Tsverling) in Berdichev, Ukraine, Swerling was one of a number of Jewish refugees from the Tsarist regime. He grew up on New York City's Lower East Side, where he sold newspapers to help support his family.

== Career ==
He worked as a newspaper and magazine writer in the early 1920s. He wrote the Marx Brothers' The Cinderella Girls, which was a failure, and he also wrote their first movie, the unreleased silent comedy short film Humor Risk (1921). He scored a major success with the book and lyrics for the musical revue The New Yorkers (1927) and the play The Kibitzer (1929), the latter co-written with actor Edward G. Robinson.

=== In Hollywood ===
Swerling was brought to Hollywood by Columbia Pictures chief Harry Cohn to work on the screenplay for Frank Capra's Ladies of Leisure (1930), the first of several collaborations with the director. His dozens of screenplays in the 1930s and 1940s include Platinum Blonde, Behind the Mask, Once to Every Woman, The Pride of the Yankees (for which he received an Academy Award nomination), Lifeboat, Leave Her to Heaven, and It's a Wonderful Life. He also provided some uncredited writing for Gone with the Wind.

=== Back to Broadway ===
Swerling returned to Broadway in 1950 to write the book for Guys and Dolls. The book received a comprehensive rewrite from Abraham "Abe" Burrows, though the songs had been written with Swerling's book in mind, and both writers were credited. The book would go on to win the 1951 Tony Award and New York Drama Critics' Circle Award.

== Personal life ==
Swerling was the father of Peter Swerling, the world's leading radar theoretician of the second half of the 20th century, and Jo Swerling Jr., producer of such television series as Alias Smith and Jones, The Rockford Files, Baretta, The Greatest American Hero, The A-Team, and Profit. Swerling maintained a condo in the Golf Club Estates neighborhood of Palm Springs, California.

== Partial filmography ==
As screenwriter

- Humor Risk (short, 1921)
- Miss Nobody (story, 1926)
- Around the Corner (1930)
- Sisters (1930)
- Hell's Island (1930)
- Ladies Must Play (1930)
- Rain or Shine (1930)
- The Squealer (1930)
- Ladies of Leisure (1930)
- Madonna of the Streets (1930)
- Dirigible (1931)
- The Miracle Woman (1931)
- Last Parade (1931)
- Ten Cents a Dance (1931)
- Carne de Cabaret (1931)
- The Good Bad Girl (1931)
- The Deceiver (1931)
- Platinum Blonde (1931)
- Forbidden (1932)
- Shopworn (1932)
- Hollywood Speaks (1932)
- War Correspondent (1932)
- Washington Merry-Go-Round (1932)
- Man Against Woman (1932)
- Behind the Mask (1932)
- Love Affair (1932)
- Attorney for the Defense (1932)
- As the Devil Commands (1932)
- The Circus Queen Murder (1933)
- Below the Sea (1933)
- As the Devil Commands (1933)
- The Wrecker (1933)
- East of Fifth Avenue (1933)
- Man's Castle (1933)
- The Woman I Stole (1933)
- No Greater Glory (1934)
- Sisters Under the Skin (1934)
- The Defense Rests (1934)
- Lady by Choice (1934)
- Once to Every Woman (1934)
- Love Me Forever (1935)
- The Whole Town's Talking (1935)
- The Music Goes 'Round (1936)
- Pennies from Heaven (1936)
- Double Wedding (1937)
- Dr. Rhythm (1938)
- I Am the Law (1938)
- Made for Each Other (1939)
- The Real Glory (1939)
- Gone with the Wind (1939) (not credited)
- The Westerner (1940)
- Blood and Sand (1941)
- Confirm or Deny (1941)
- The Pride of the Yankees (1942)
- Crash Dive (1943)
- A Lady Takes a Chance (1943)
- Lifeboat (1944)
- Leave Her to Heaven (1945)
- It's a Wonderful Life (1946) (uncredited)
- Thunder in the East (1952)
- Guys and Dolls (1955)
- The Big Bankroll (1961)
- King of the Roaring Twenties (1961)

Other

- Melody Lane (1929) (play)
- New York Town (1941) (story)
