= Peter Swerling =

American radar theoretician

- Born: March 4, 1929; New York City, U.S.
- Died: August 25, 2000 (aged 71); California, U.S.
- Education: University of California, Los Angeles; Cornell University; California Institute of Technology
- Known for: Swerling Target Models
- Spouse: Judith Ann Butler (m. 1958)
- Children: 3
- Parent: Jo Swerling (father)
- Relatives: Jo Swerling Jr. (brother)
- Scientific career
- Fields: Mathematics, Electronic engineering
- Thesis: Families of Transformations in the Function Spaces H^{p}
- Doctoral advisor: Angus Taylor

Peter Swerling (March 4, 1929 – August 25, 2000) was one of the most influential radar theoreticians in the second half of the 20th century. He is best known for the class of statistically "fluctuating target" scattering models he developed at the RAND Corporation in the early 1950s to characterize the performance of pulsed radar systems, referred to as Swerling Targets I, II, III, and IV in the literature of radar. Swerling also contributed to the optimal estimation of orbits of satellites and trajectories of missiles, anticipating the development of the Kalman filter. He also founded two companies, one of which continues his engineering work today.

== Biography ==
=== Early life and family ===
Peter Swerling was born in New York City on 4 March 1929 to Jo Swerling and Florence (née Manson) Swerling. He grew up in Beverly Hills, California, where his father was a successful screenwriter. Peter had a younger brother, Jo Jr. Swerling's father recognized his young son's intellectual gifts. Granting a tenth birthday request, he introduced Peter to Albert Einstein, who advised the boy to continue his studies in mathematics.

=== Education ===
Peter Swerling entered the California Institute of Technology at the age of 15 and received a Bachelor of Science in Mathematics three years later in 1947. He went on to take a second undergraduate degree, this time in Economics, from Cornell University in 1949, and was admitted into Phi Beta Kappa. He then attended the University of California, Los Angeles (UCLA), where he received a Master of Arts in mathematics in 1951 and a Ph.D. in mathematics in 1955. His thesis Families of Transformations in the Function Spaces H^{p} was advised by Angus Ellis Taylor, and investigated families of bounded linear transformations in Banach spaces.

=== Career ===
While still in graduate school, Swerling worked full-time for Douglas Aircraft Company as a staff member of the newly formed Project RAND. He wrote his landmark report, "Probability of Detection for Fluctuating Targets," for the RAND Corporation (now independent from Douglas Aircraft) in 1954. The paper introduced a set of statistically "fluctuating target" scattering models to characterize the detection performance of pulsed radar systems. Building on the work of Jess Marcum (who statistically subtracted noise from images of steady targets), Swerling accounted for statistical fluctuations of the target itself. The models became known as Swerling Target Models Cases I, II, III, and IV in radar literature.

In related work, Swerling made significant contributions to the optimal estimation of orbits of satellites and trajectories of missiles. Working in the fields of least-squares estimation and signal processing, Swerling published papers in 1958 and 1959 on "stagewise" smoothing, the first efforts to exploit the computational advantages of applying recursion to least-squares problems. His work, particularly "First-Order Error Propagation in a Stagewise Smoothing Procedure for Satellite Observations," anticipated that of Rudolf E. Kálmán, whose linear quadratic estimation technique became known as the Kalman filter.

Swerling went on to participate in special studies and task forces for the Department of Defense in areas such as the Aegis Combat System and vulnerabilities of AWACS and Patriot missile systems to electronic countermeasures; he developed more sophisticated radar models for application to targets using stealth technology.

Peter Swerling was a department manager for Conductron Corporation in Inglewood, California from 1961 to 1964. In 1966, he founded Technology Service Corporation in Santa Monica, California. With Swerling as president for 16 years, the company grew to 200 employees, had a successful IPO in 1983, and was acquired by Westinghouse Electric Corporation in 1985. In 1983, Swerling co-founded Swerling Manasse & Smith, Inc., in Canoga Park, California; he served as its president and CEO for 12 years from 1986 until his retirement in 1998.

Beginning in 1965, for several years Swerling was an adjunct professor of electrical engineering at the University of Southern California; he taught advanced seminars in communication theory and served on doctoral committees. He was a founder and long-term trustee of Crossroads School, a K-12 private school prominent in the Los Angeles area.

=== Recognition and assessment ===
In 1978, Swerling was elected to membership in the National Academy of Engineering; election to the academy honors important contributions to engineering theory, as well as unusual accomplishments in developing fields of technology. Swerling was named a Fellow of the Institute of Electrical and Electronics Engineers in 1968 "for contributions to signal theory as applied to errors in tracking and trajectory prediction of missiles by radar;" he was recognized as a Life Fellow in 1994. Technology Service Corporation recognizes its founder by granting the Peter Swerling Award for Entrepreneurial Excellence to select employees who have made significant contributions to the growth and success of the company.

Reviewing Swerling's impact, Solomon W. Golomb wrote that he was "probably the most influential radar theoretician of the second half of the 20th century, not only in the United States, but in the entire world."

=== Later life and death ===
Swerling died 25 August 2000, of cancer in Southern California. Swerling's survivors include his wife of 42 years, Judith Ann (née Butler), three children (Elizabeth, Carole, and Steven), and his brother Jo.

== Selected publications ==
- Swerling, Peter (January 1957). "Families of Transformations in the Function Spaces H^{p}" (PDF). Pacific Journal of Mathematics. 7 (1): 1015–1029. doi:10.2140/pjm.1957.7.1015.
- Swerling, Peter (15 June 1959). First-Order Error Propagation in a Stagewise Smoothing Procedure for Satellite Observations (PDF). Research Memoranda. Vol. RM-2329. Santa Monica, CA: RAND Corporation.
- Swerling, Peter (April 1960). "Probability of Detection for Fluctuating Targets". IRE Transactions on Information Theory. 6 (2): 269–308. doi:10.1109/TIT.1960.1057561. Originally published 17 March 1954 as RAND Research Memorandum RM-1217.
