= Kilmalkedar =

Medieval monastic site in County Kerry, Ireland

- Cill Maoilchéadair
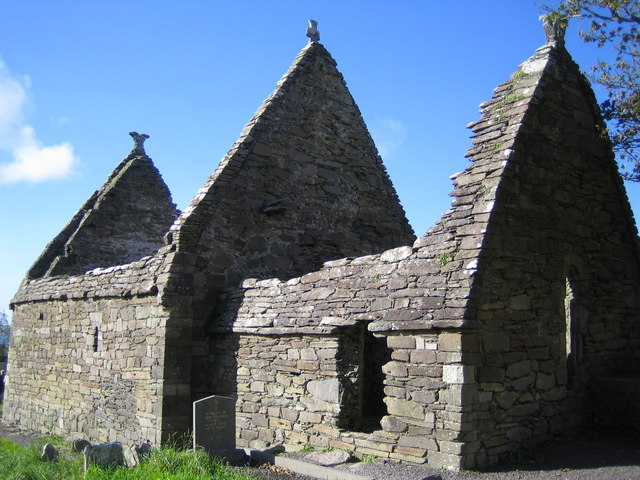
- Church

- Location within Ireland
- Interactive map of Kilmalkedar

Monastery information
- Other name: Cell-maeilchetair
- Established: early 7th century AD
- Disestablished: 12th century
- Diocese: Ardfert and Aghadoe

People
- Founder: Saint Maolcethair

Architecture
- Status: Inactive
- Style: Celtic Christianity, Romanesque

Site
- Location: Kilmalkedar, Dingle Peninsula, County Kerry
- Coordinates: 52.184775°N 10.33623°W
- Visible remains: stone church, cross, oratory, holy well
- Public access: yes

Kilmalkedar (Irish: Cill Maoilchéadair) is a medieval ecclesiastical site and National Monument located in County Kerry, Ireland.

== Location ==
Kilmalkedar is on the Dingle Peninsula, 4.8 km (3.0 mi) east of Ballyferriter and 6.7 km (4.2 mi) northwest of Dingle. The monument is in a townland and civil parish of the same name.

== History ==
Kilmalkedar is traditionally associated with Saint Brendan (c. AD 484 – c. 577), but also with a local saint, Maolcethair (Irish: Maol Céadair, Maol Céaltair, Malkedar; died 636).

The surviving church dates to the mid-12th century, with the chancel extended c. 1200.

It was a traditional assembly site for pilgrims, who followed the Saint's Road (Irish: Cosán na Naomh) northeast to Mount Brandon.

Some of the rituals carried out by locals, like performing nine clockwise circuits of the site on Easter Sunday, or the boring of holes in standing stones, suggest remnants of Celtic religion; Kilmalkedar may well have been a religious site long before Christianity arrived.

== Buildings ==
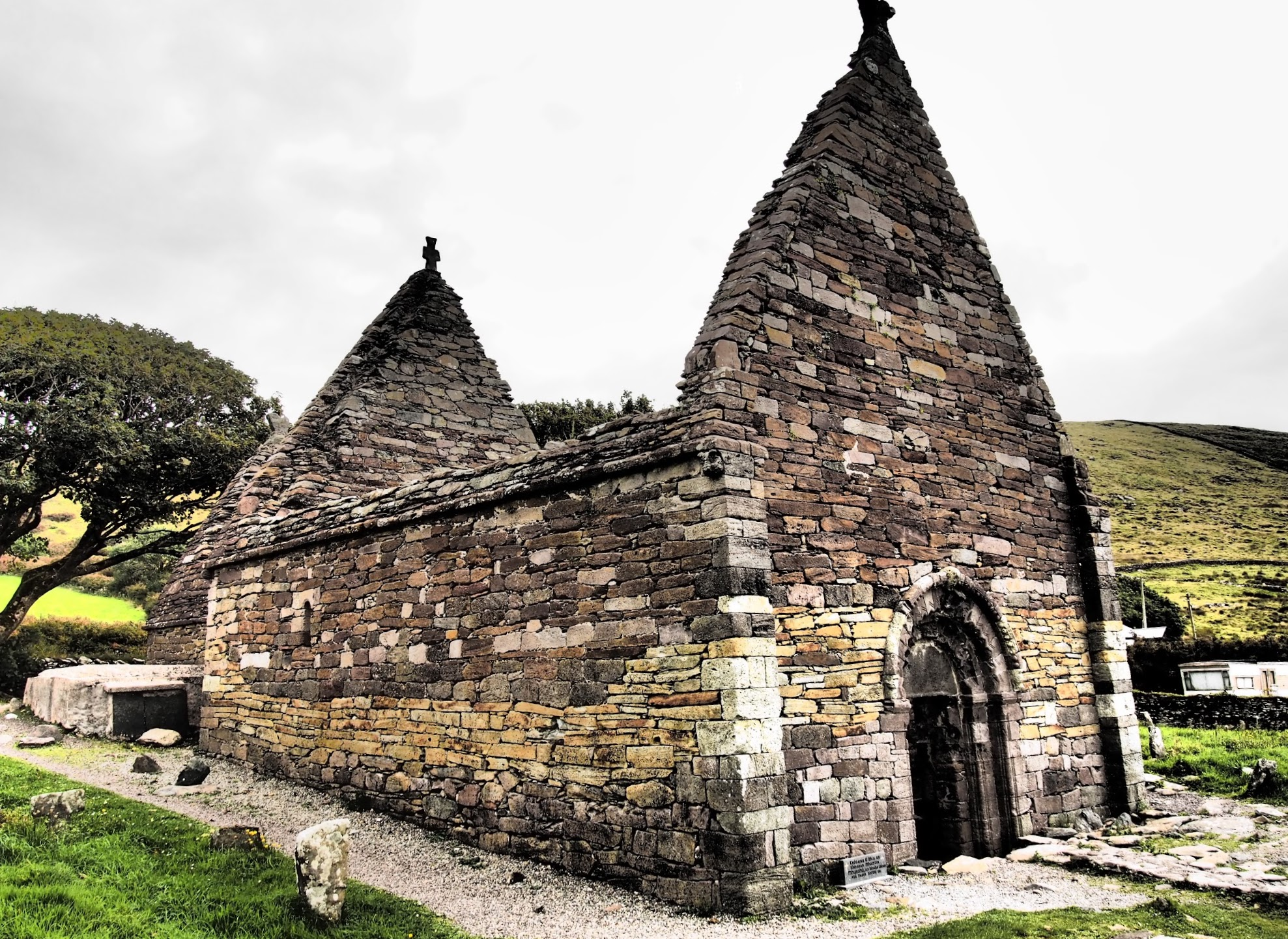
NW view

The church resembles Cormac's Chapel on the Rock of Cashel (built 1127–1134). Its nave is 8.28 m × 9.4 m (27.2 ft × 30.8 ft) with antae and steep gables. The chancel is 5.72 m × 5.1 m (18.8 ft × 16.7 ft) externally. The doorway is a notable Hiberno-Romanesque piece. A hole in the east wall of the chancel is called "the eye of the needle"; if one can fit through it, one is certain to go to heaven.

Pre-Romanesque remains include a corbelled building, perhaps a monastic cell; an alphabet stone; an Ogham stone; a sundial; a stone cross; and some bullauns. One of the bullauns is associated with the mythical cow Glas Gaibhnenn.

The alphabet stone is carved with "DNI" (domini) and the Latin alphabet in uncial script, carved c. AD 550–600.

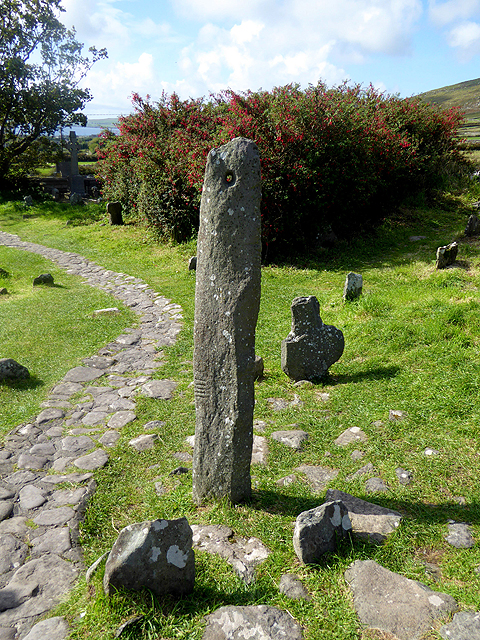
Ogham stone. The hole bored in the top is unique.

The Ogham stone (CIIC 187) reads ẠṆM MẠỊLE-INBIR/ MACI BROCANN ("Name of Máel-Inbher son of Broccán") and dates to c. AD 600.

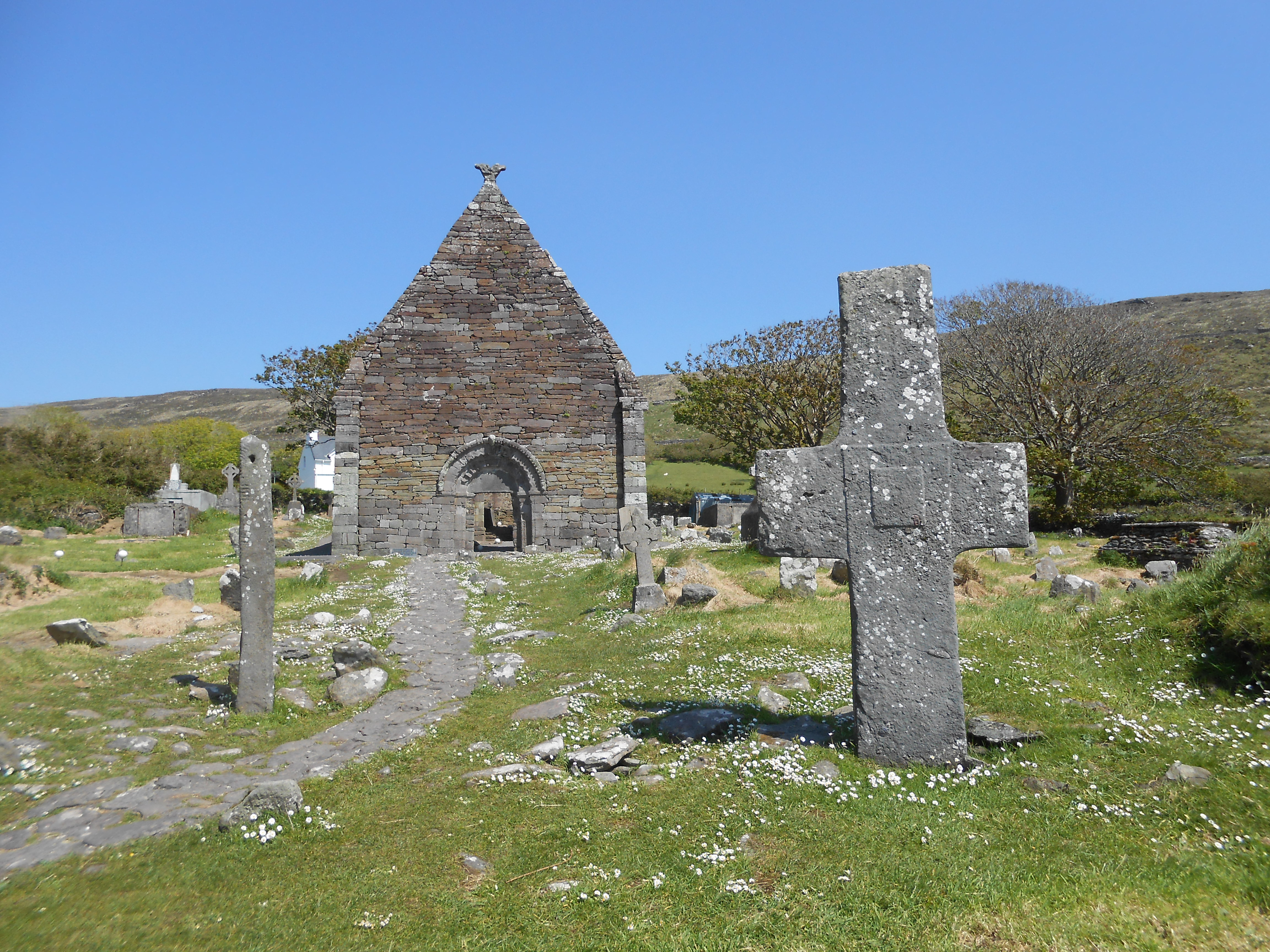
Ogham stone, church, stone cross

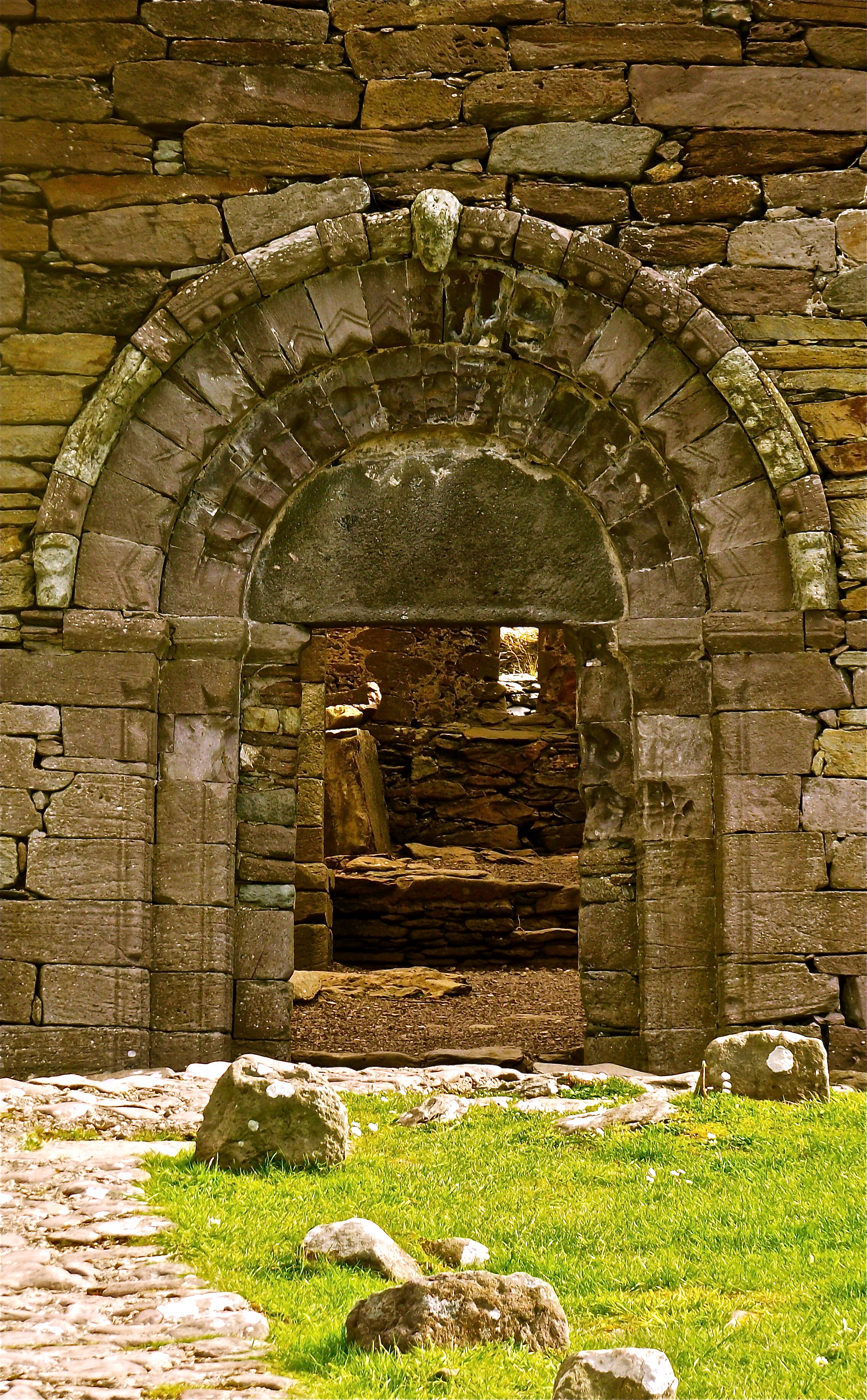
Hiberno-Romanesque doorway

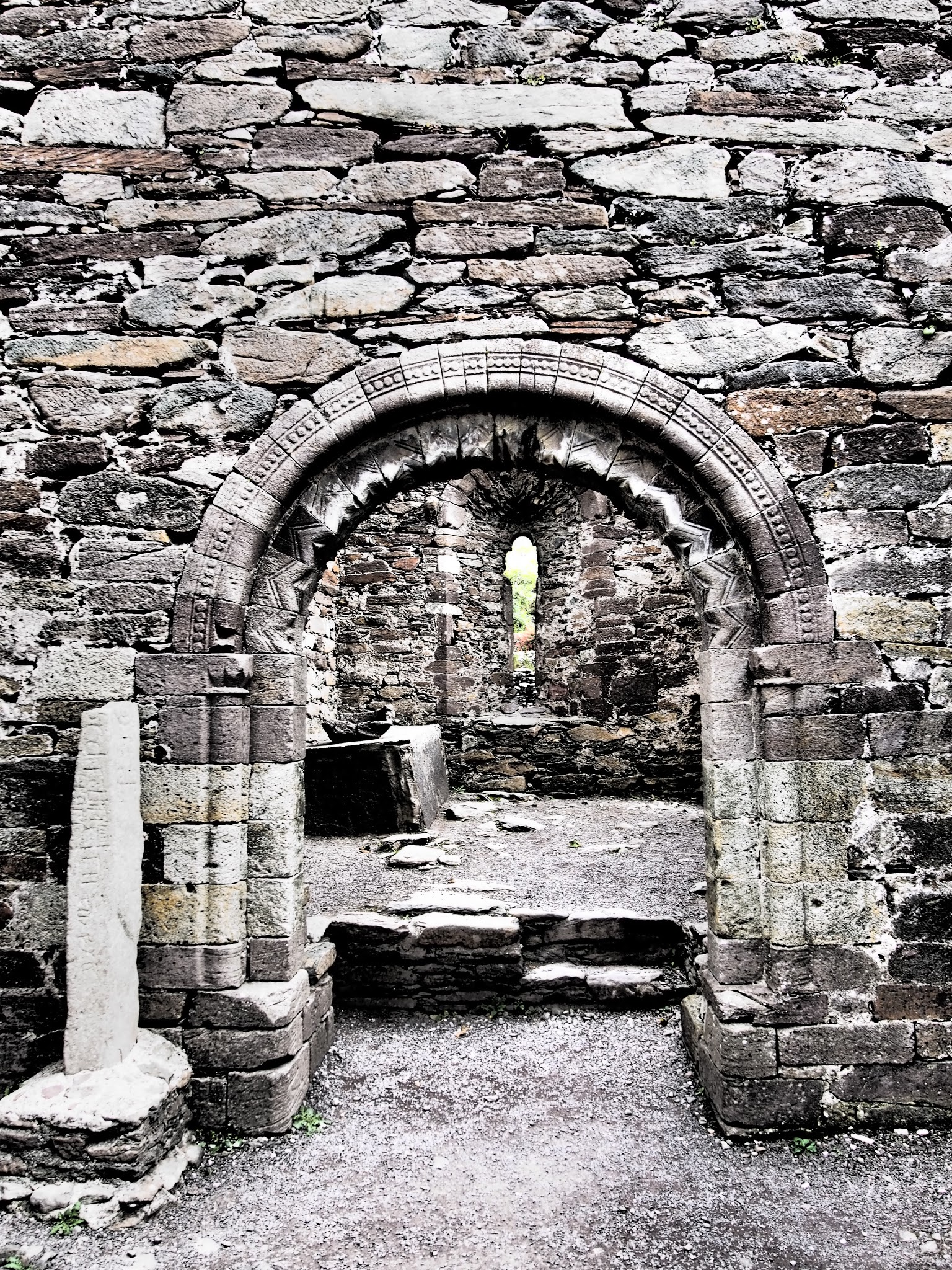
Doorway

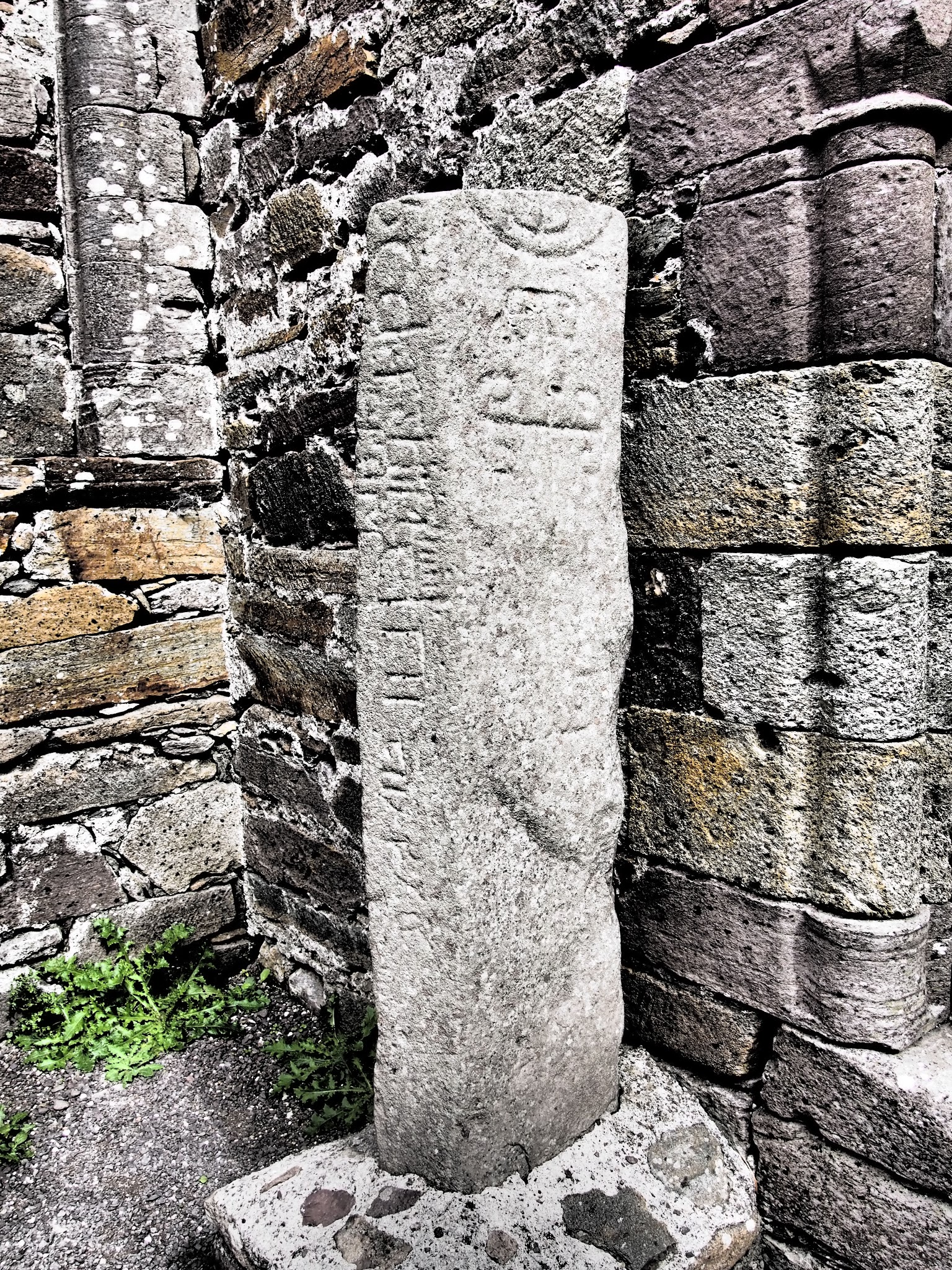
Alphabet stone

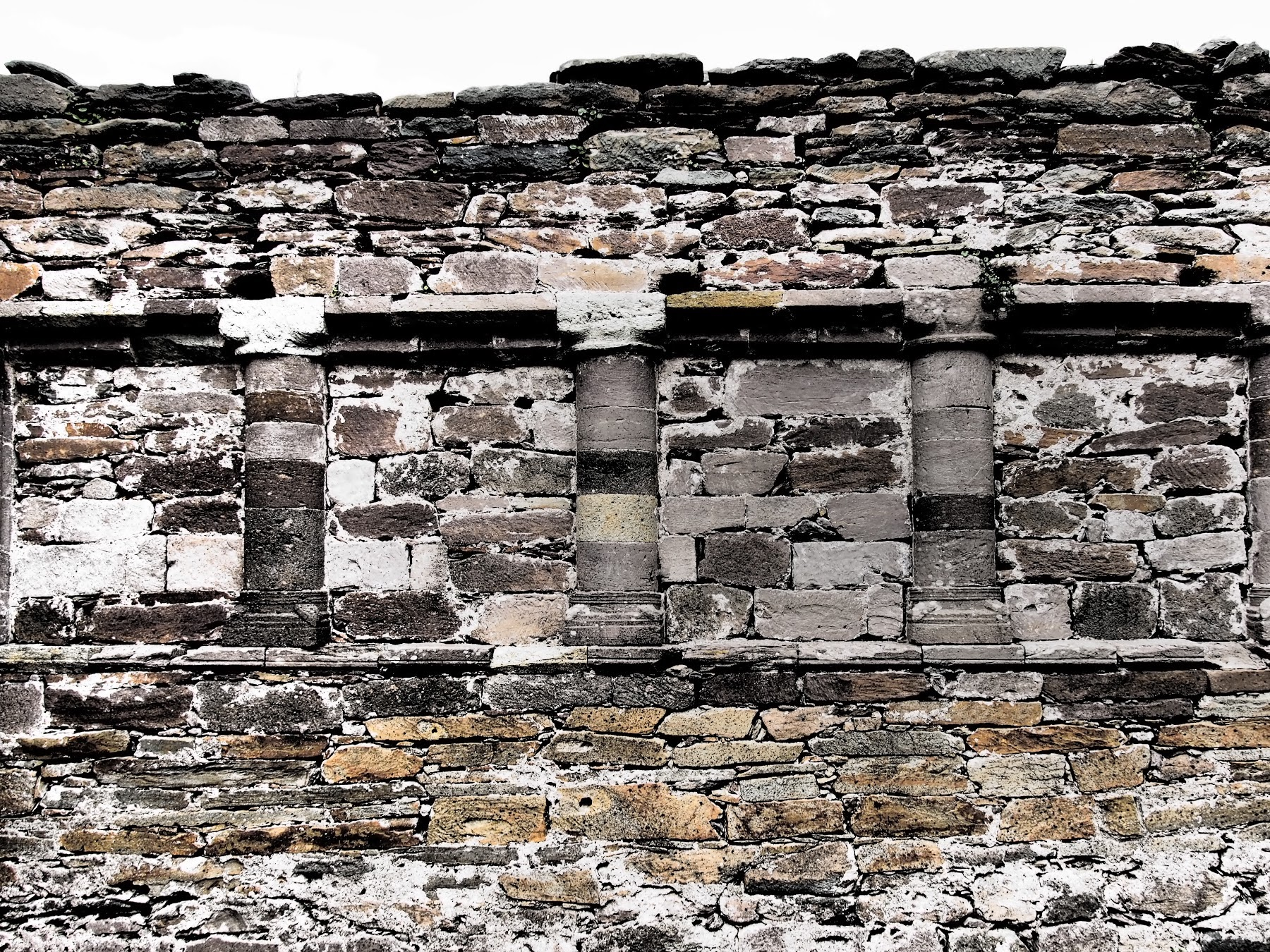
blind arcade in the church

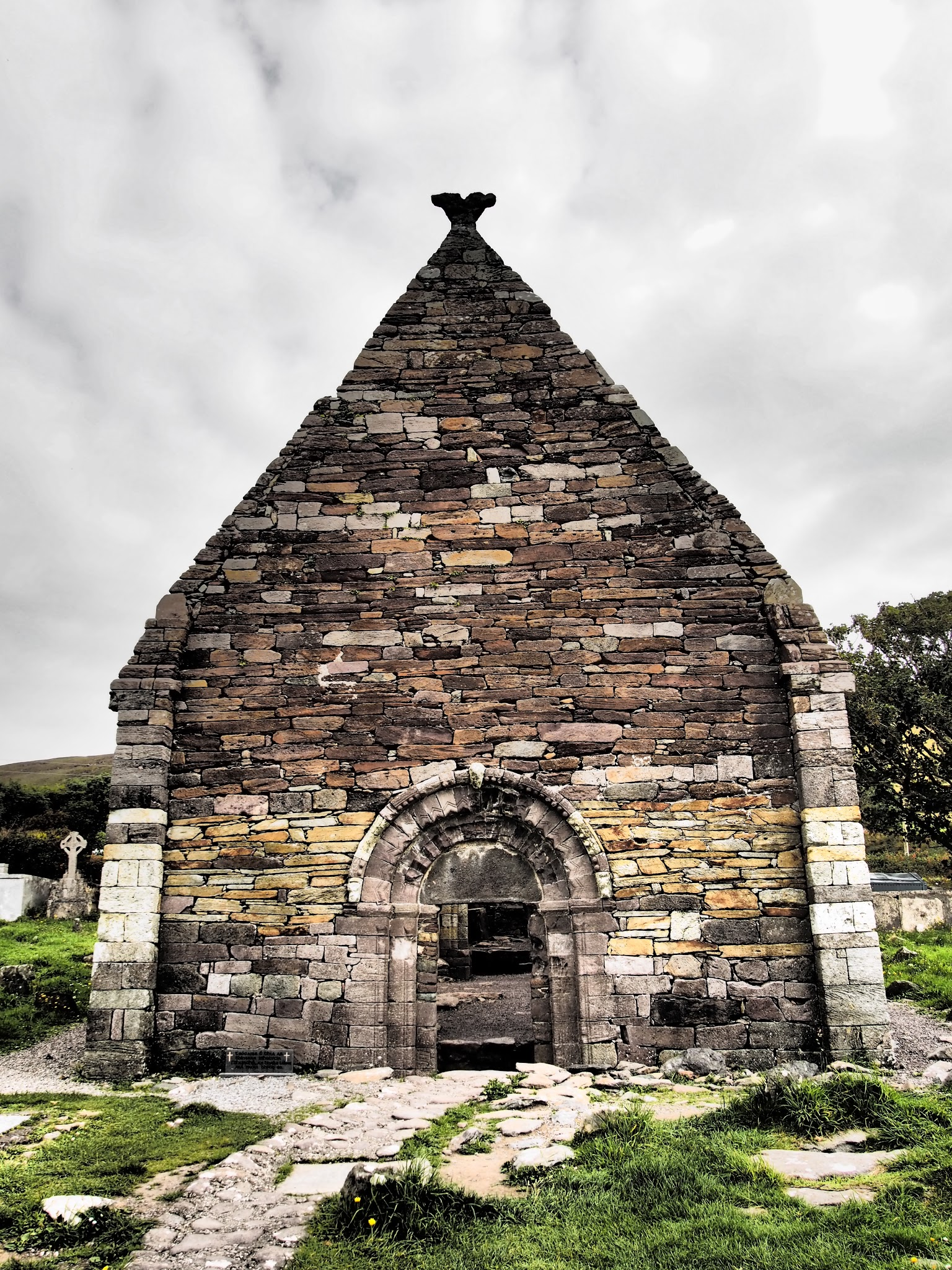
Church, west elevation

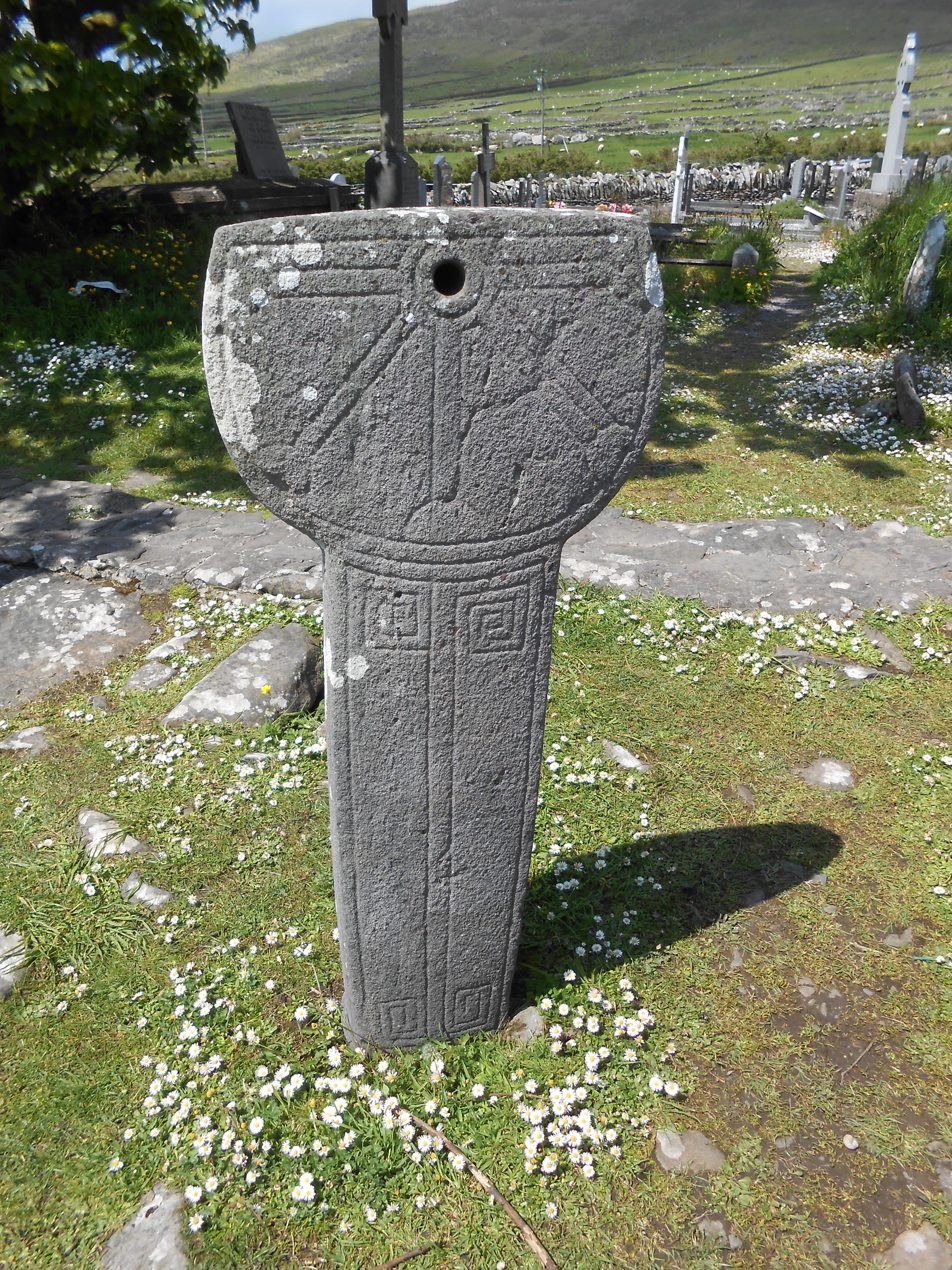
Sundial stone

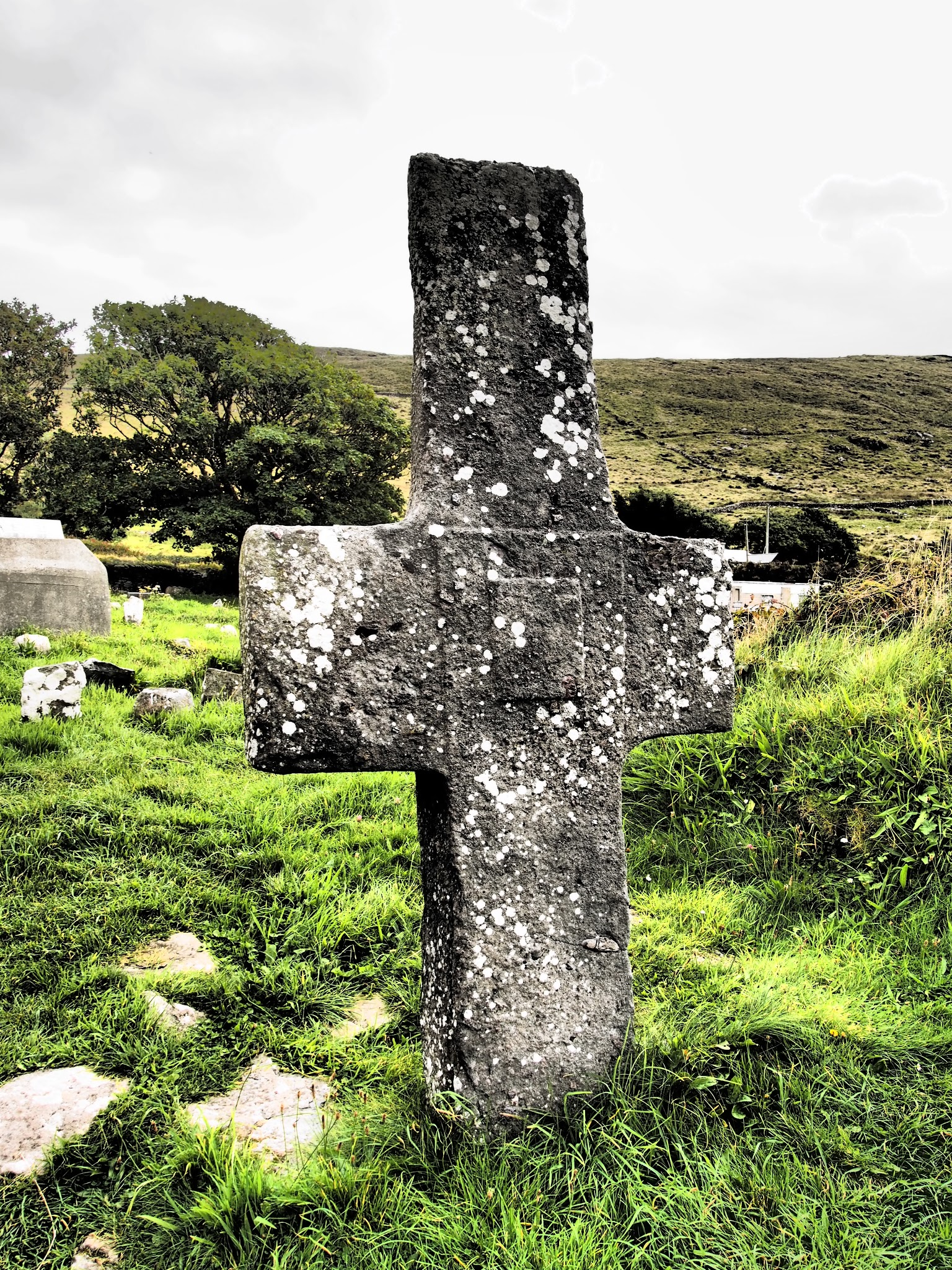
Stone cross

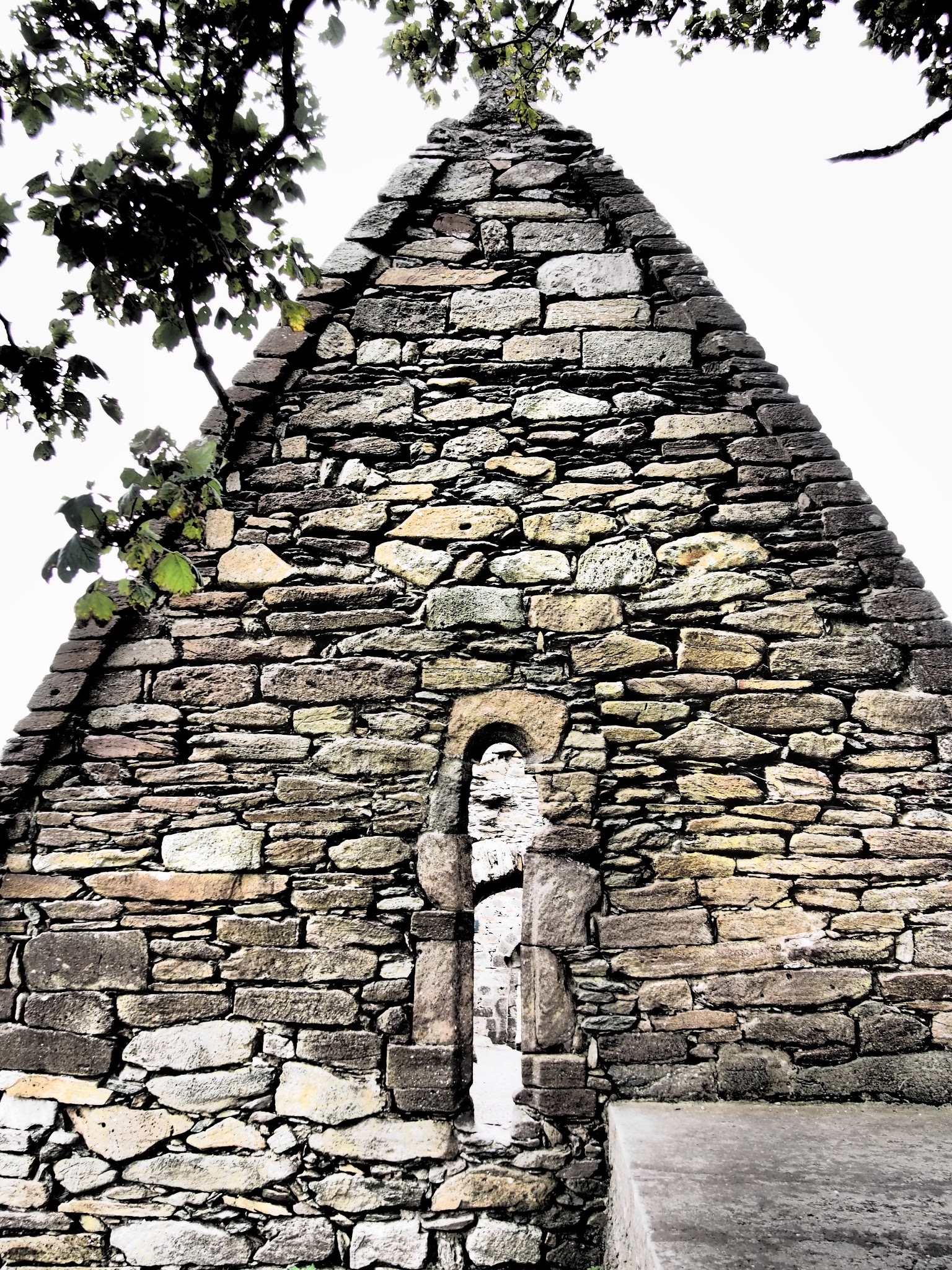
Chancel exterior
