= Pelasgia =

Pelasgia (Greek: Πελασγία, land of the Pelasgians) in historical geography may be an earlier toponym of

- Greece (Hellas)
- Arcadia
- the Peloponnese
- Larissa Cremaste, a city in Phthiotis, southern Thessaly, where the historical Pelasgiotis district existed.

== See also ==
- Pelasgus
