= Dipylon inscription =

c. 740 BCE Greek inscription

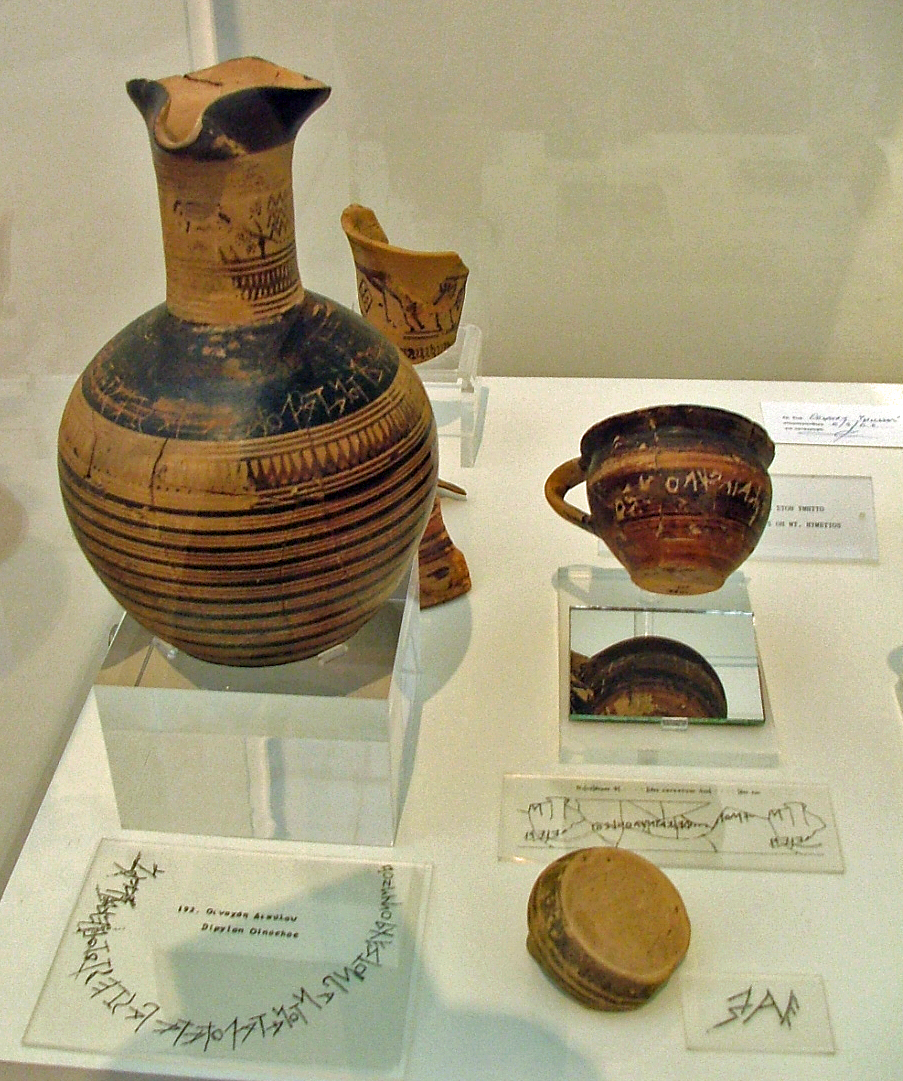
- Dipylon oenochoe (left), on display in the National Archaeological Museum, Athens. The inscription is scratched into the dark band around the shoulder of the vase.
- Material: Clay
- Created: c. 740 BC
- Discovered: 1871; Athens, Attica, Greece
- Present location: Athens, Attica, Greece

The Dipylon inscription is a short text written on an ancient Greek pottery vessel dated to c. 740 BC. It is famous for being the oldest, or one of the oldest, known samples of the use of the Greek alphabet. The text is scratched on an oenochoe, which was found in 1871 and is named after the location where it was found, the ancient Dipylon Cemetery, near the Dipylon Gate on the area of Kerameikos in Athens. The jug is attributed to the Late Geometrical Period (750–700 BC). It is now in the National Archaeological Museum of Athens (inv. 192).

== Text ==
The text is written in an archaic form of the Greek alphabet, with some letter shapes still resembling those of the original Phoenician alphabet. For example, the Greek letter zeta (Ζ) resembles the Phoenician letter zayin (I). The text is written from right to left, with the individual letters mirror-shaped in comparison with the modern forms. It is placed in a circle around the shoulder of the vessel. The text consists of 46 characters, of which the first 35 can easily be read as a hexametric verse in Greek. The fragmentary rest is believed to have been the beginning of the second verse of a distichon, but the exact interpretation is unclear. B. Powell has argued that the final characters may represent a garbled snippet from the middle of an abecedarium (ΚΛΜΝ) by a second hand, someone learning to write. More recently, N. M. Binek has shown that the last six markings can "be viewed not as letters or as attempts to inscribe letters, but rather as decorative elements fashioned by a second inscriber in accordance with the principles of Geometric idiom", inasmuch as the segment roughly mirrors the shapes of letters 9-4 (ΧΡΟΝΥΝ). The text marks the vessel as a prize in a dancing competition. It is translated as: "whoever of the dancers now dances most lightly ...", and the second line is conjectured to have said something to the effect of "... he shall get this (vessel as his prize)".

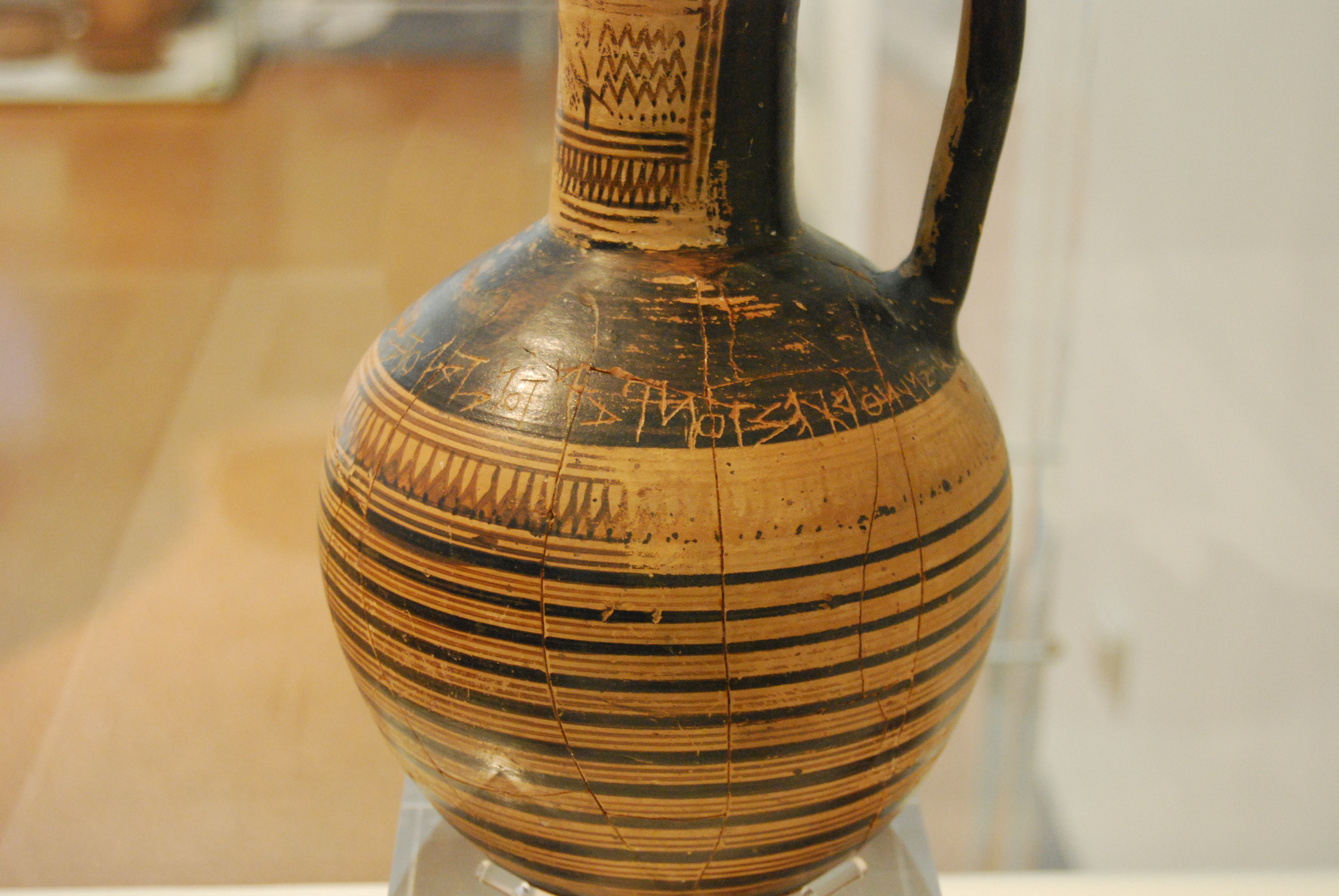
...(h)ος νῦν ὀρχεστôν πάντον ἀταλό(τατα)...

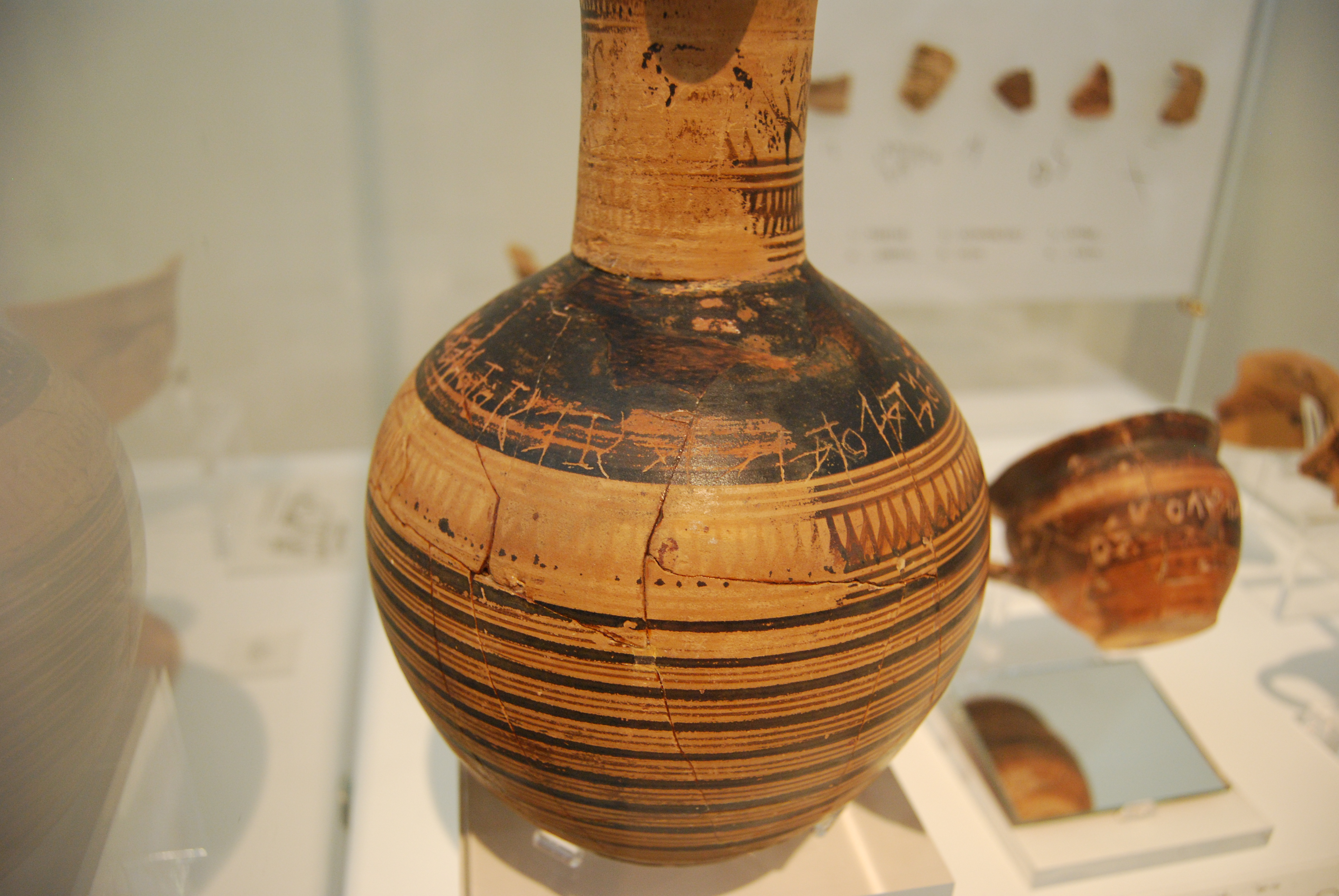
... ἀταλότατα παίζει, τô τόδε ...

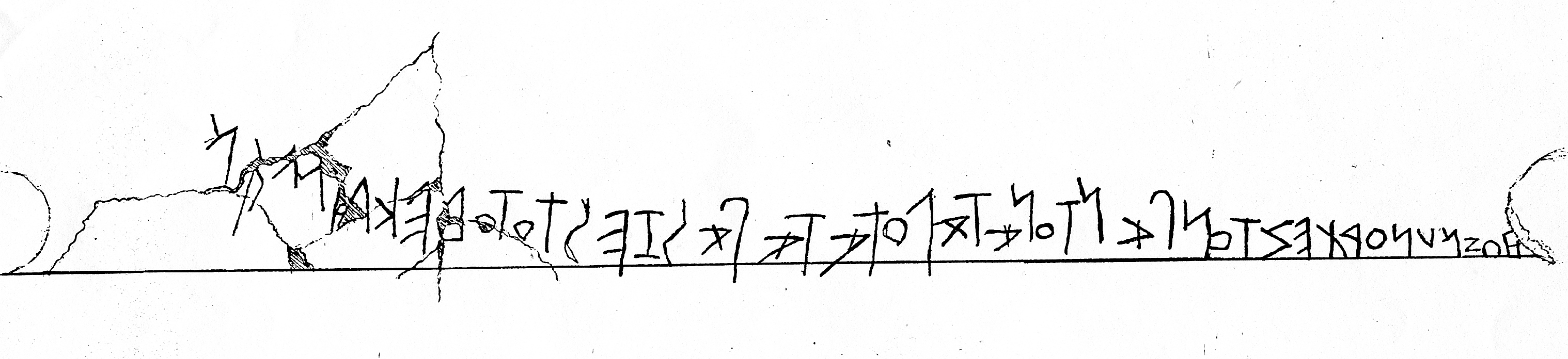
Transcription of Dipylon Oinochoe Inscription (Powell, 1988)

The text of the inscription runs:

ΗΟΣΝΥΝΟΡΧΕΣΤΟΝΠΑΝΤΟΝΑΤΑΛΟΤΑΤΑΠΑΙΖΕΙΤΟΤΟΔΕΚΛ[?]ΜΙ[?]Ν

In modern scholarly editions, this is sometimes transcribed as:

ὸς νῦν ὀρχεστôν πάντον ἀταλότατα παίζει,
τô τόδε κλμιν[...]

This corresponds to the following in the later classical orthography in Greek (using the Ionian form of the Greek alphabet), with the metric feet of the hexameter indicated:

ὃς νῦν | ὀρχη|στῶν πάν|των ἀτα|λώτατα | παίζει
τοῦ τόδε ...

Literal translation:

Whoever of all these dancers now plays most delicately,
of him this (sc. pot)...

== Nestor's cup ==
It is believed that either the Dipylon inscription or the Nestor's Cup is the oldest known alphabetic Greek inscription. The Nestor Cup, which also bears a verse inscription, was found in an excavation at the ancient Greek colony of Pithekoussai, on the island of Ischia, in Italy. It is thought to be of equal age with the Dipylon inscription or slightly younger.

== See also ==
- Acesander's cup
- History of the Greek alphabet
- Pottery of Ancient Greece
