= Fluctuation loss =

Interference effect in radar systems

Fluctuation loss is an effect seen in radar systems as the target object moves or changes its orientation relative to the radar system. It was extensively studied during the 1950s by Peter Swerling, who introduced the Swerling models to allow the effect to be simulated. For this reason, it is sometimes known as Swerling loss or similar names.

The effect occurs when the target's physical size is within a key range of values relative to the wavelength of the radar signal. As the signal reflects off various parts of the target, they may interfere as they return to the radar receiver. At any single distance from the station, this will cause the signal to be amplified or diminished compared to the baseline signal one calculates from the radar equation. As the target moves, these patterns change. This causes the signal to fluctuate in strength and may cause it to disappear entirely at certain times.

The effect can be reduced or eliminated by operating on more than one frequency or using modulation techniques like pulse compression that change the frequency over the period of a pulse. In these cases, it is unlikely that the pattern of reflections from the target causes the same destructive interference at two different frequencies.

Swerling modeled these effects in a famous 1954 paper introduced while working at RAND Corporation. Swerling's models considered the contribution of multiple small reflectors, or many small reflectors and a single large one. This offered the ability to model real-world objects like aircraft to understand the expected fluctuation loss effects.

== Fluctuation loss ==
For basic considerations of the strength of a signal returned by a given target, the radar equation models the target as a single point in space with a given radar cross-section (RCS). The RCS is difficult to estimate except for the most basic cases, like a perpendicular surface or a sphere. Before the introduction of detailed computer modeling, the RCS for real-world objects was generally measured instead of calculated from first principles.

Such models fail to account for real-world effects due to the radar signal reflecting off multiple points on the target. If the distance between these points is on the order of the wavelength of the radar signal, the reflections are subject to wave interference effects that can cause the signal to be amplified or diminished depending on the exact path lengths. As the target moves in relation to the radar, these distances change and create a constantly changing signal. On the radar display, this causes the signal to fade in and out, making target tracking difficult. This effect is identical to the fading that occurs in radio signals in a car as it moves about, which is caused by multipath propagation.

One way to reduce or eliminate this effect is to have two or more frequencies in the radar signal. Unless the distances between the aircraft parts are distributed at a multiple of both wavelengths, which can be eliminated by selecting suitable frequencies, one of the two signals will generally be free of this effect. This was used in the AN/FPS-24 radar, for instance. Multi-frequency signals of this sort also give the radar system frequency agility, which is useful for avoiding jamming from a carcinotron, so most radars of the 1960s had some capability to avoid fluctuation loss even if this was not an explicit design goal.

== Swerling Target Models ==
The Swerling target models address these issues by modeling the target as a number of individual radiators and considering the result using the chi-squared distribution:

$$p(\sigma) = \frac{m}{\Gamma(m) \sigma_{av}} \left ( \frac{m\sigma}{\sigma_{av}} \right )^{m - 1} e^{-\frac{m\sigma}{\sigma_{av}}}
I_{[0,\infty)}(\sigma)$$

where $\sigma_{av}$ refers to the mean value of $\sigma$. This is not always easy to determine, as certain objects may be viewed the most frequently from a limited range of angles. For instance, a sea-based radar system is most likely to view a ship from the side, the front, and the back, but never the top or the bottom. $m$ is the degree of freedom divided by 2. The degree of freedom used in the chi-squared probability density function is a positive number related to the target model. Values of $m$ between 0.3 and 2 have been found to closely approximate certain simple shapes, such as cylinders or cylinders with fins.

Since the ratio of the standard deviation to the mean value of the chi-squared distribution is equal to $m$^{−1/2}, larger values of $m$ will result in smaller fluctuations. If $m$ equals infinity, the target's RCS is non-fluctuating.

The difference between the models is largely to the degrees of freedom and the general layout of the target. The first four of these models were considered in Swerling's original paper, and are referred to as models I through IV. The V model, also referred to as the 0 model, is the degenerate case with an infinite number of degrees of freedom.

=== Swerling I ===
A model where the RCS varies according to a chi-squared probability density function with two degrees of freedom ($m = 1$). This applies to a target that is made up of many independent scatterers of roughly equal areas. As few as half a dozen scattering surfaces can produce this distribution. This model is particularly useful for considering aircraft shapes.

Swerling I describes the case in which the target's velocity is low compared to the observation time, and can thus be considered non-moving. This is the case for a scanning radar, which sweeps its signal past the target in a relatively short time, often on the order of milliseconds. The motion of the target is thus seen only from scan-to-scan, not intra-scan. In this case, the pdf reduces to:

$$p(\sigma) = \frac{1}{\sigma_{av}} e^{-\frac{\sigma}{\sigma_{av}}}$$

=== Swerling II ===
Similar to Swerling I, except the RCS values change from pulse-to-pulse, instead of scan-to-scan. This is the case for very high-speed targets, or, more commonly, "staring" radars like fire-control radars or search radars that are locked-on to a single target.

=== Swerling III ===
A model where the RCS varies according to a Chi-squared probability density function with four degrees of freedom ($m = 2$). This PDF approximates an object with one large scattering surface with several other small scattering surfaces. Examples include some helicopters and propeller-driven aircraft, as the propeller/rotor provides a strong constant signal. Model III is the analog of I, considering the case where the RCS is constant through a single scan. The pdf becomes:

$$p(\sigma) = \frac{4\sigma}{\sigma_{av}^2} e^{-\frac{2\sigma}{\sigma_{av}}}$$

=== Swerling IV ===
Similar to Swerling III, but the RCS varies from pulse-to-pulse rather than from scan-to-scan.

=== Swerling V (also known as Swerling 0) ===
Constant RCS, corresponding to infinite degrees of freedom ($m\to\infty$).
