= Inferior oblique muscle =

Part of the eye

Inferior oblique
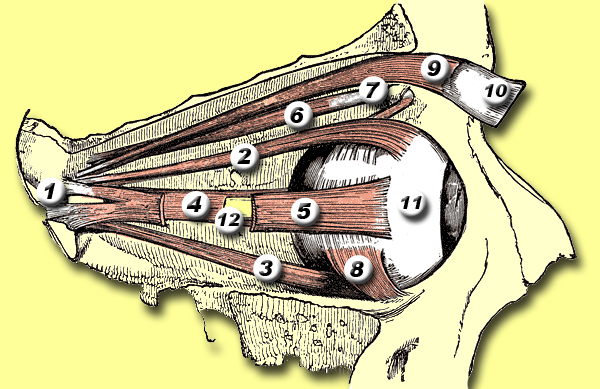
- Rectus muscles: 2 = superior, 3 = inferior, 4 = medial, 5 = lateral Oblique muscles: 6 = superior, 8 = inferior Other muscle: 9 = levator palpebrae superioris Other structures: 1 = Annulus of Zinn, 7 = Trochlea, 10 = Superior tarsus, 11 = Sclera, 12 = Optic nerve

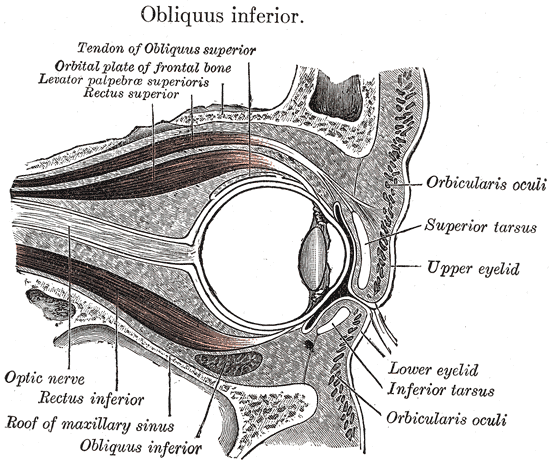
- Sagittal section of right orbital cavity.

Details
- Origin: Orbital surface of the maxilla, lateral to the lacrimal groove
- Insertion: Laterally onto the eyeball, deep to the lateral rectus, by a short flat tendon
- Artery: Ophthalmic artery
- Nerve: Oculomotor nerve
- Actions: Extorsion, elevation, abduction

Identifiers
- Latin: musculus obliquus inferior bulbi
- TA98: A15.2.07.019
- TA2: 2051
- FMA: 49040

The inferior oblique muscle or obliquus oculi inferior is a thin, narrow muscle placed near the anterior margin of the floor of the orbit. The inferior oblique is one of the extraocular muscles, and is attached to the maxillary bone (origin) and the posterior, inferior, lateral surface of the eye (insertion). The inferior oblique is innervated by the inferior branch of the oculomotor nerve.

== Structure ==
The inferior oblique arises from the orbital surface of the maxilla, lateral to the lacrimal groove. Unlike the other extraocular muscles (recti and superior oblique), the inferior oblique muscle does not originate from the common tendinous ring (annulus of Zinn).

Passing lateralward, backward, and upward, between the inferior rectus and the floor of the orbit, and just underneath the lateral rectus muscle, the inferior oblique inserts onto the scleral surface between the inferior rectus and lateral rectus.

In humans, the muscle is about 35 mm long.

=== Innervation ===
The inferior oblique is innervated by the inferior division of the oculomotor nerve (cranial nerve III).

== Function ==
Its actions are extorsion, elevation and abduction of the eye.

Primary action is extorsion (external rotation); secondary action is elevation; tertiary action is abduction (i.e. it extorts the eye and moves it upward and outwards). The field of maximal inferior oblique elevation is in the adducted position.

The inferior oblique muscle is the only muscle that is capable of elevating the eye when it is in a fully adducted position.

A montage of five pictures of the right eye of a male subject with partial heterochromia, demonstrating torsional eye movement

== Clinical significance ==
While commonly affected by palsies of the inferior division of the oculomotor nerve, isolated palsies of the inferior oblique (without affecting other functions of the oculomotor nerve) are quite rare.

"Overaction" of the inferior oblique muscle is a commonly observed component of childhood strabismus, particularly infantile esotropia and exotropia. Because true hyperinnervation is not usually present, this phenomenon is better termed "elevation in adduction".

Surgical procedures of the inferior oblique include: loosening (also known as recession see Strabismus surgery), myectomy, marginal myotomy, and denervation and extirpation. It is also encountered and identified in lower lid blepharoplasty surgeries.

== Additional images ==
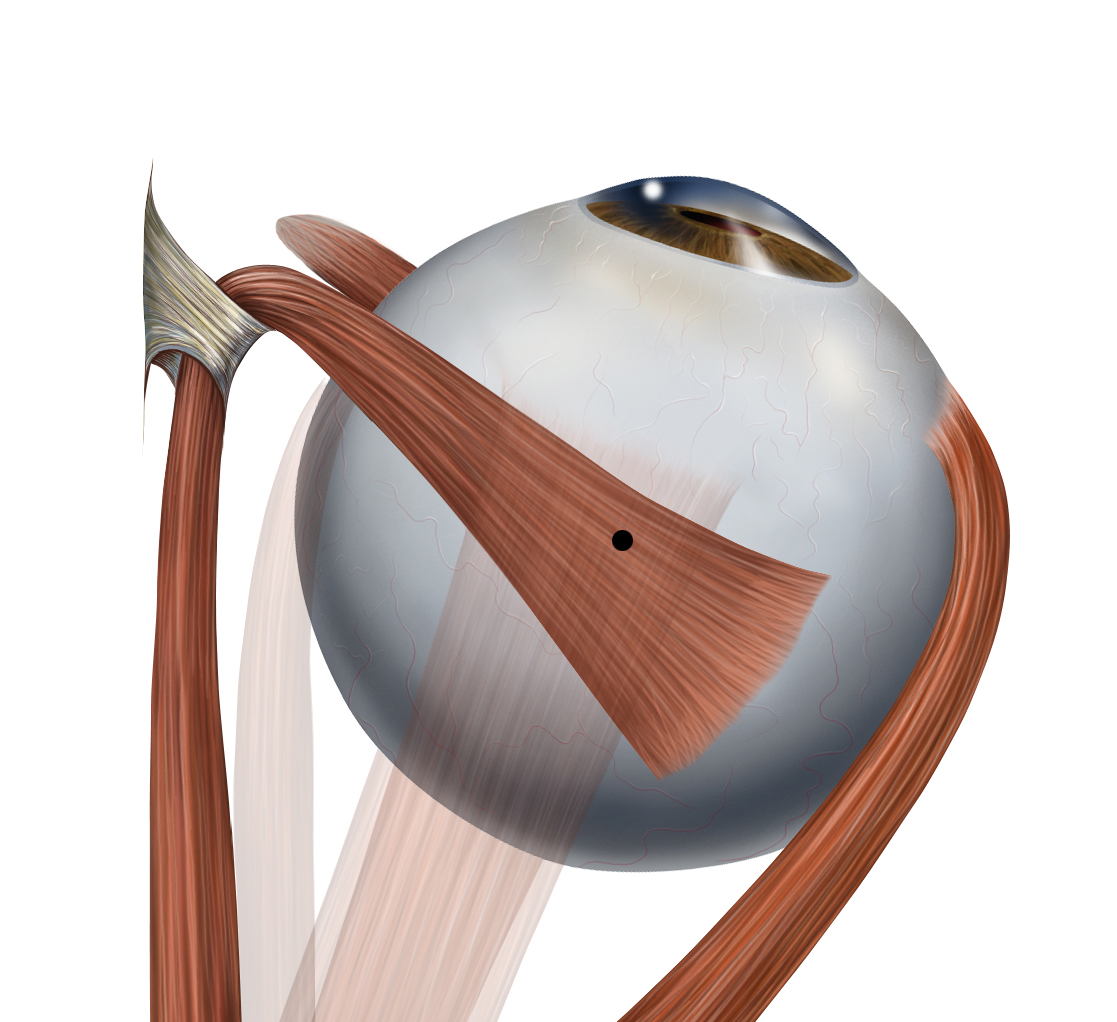
Eye movement of lateral rectus muscle, superior view

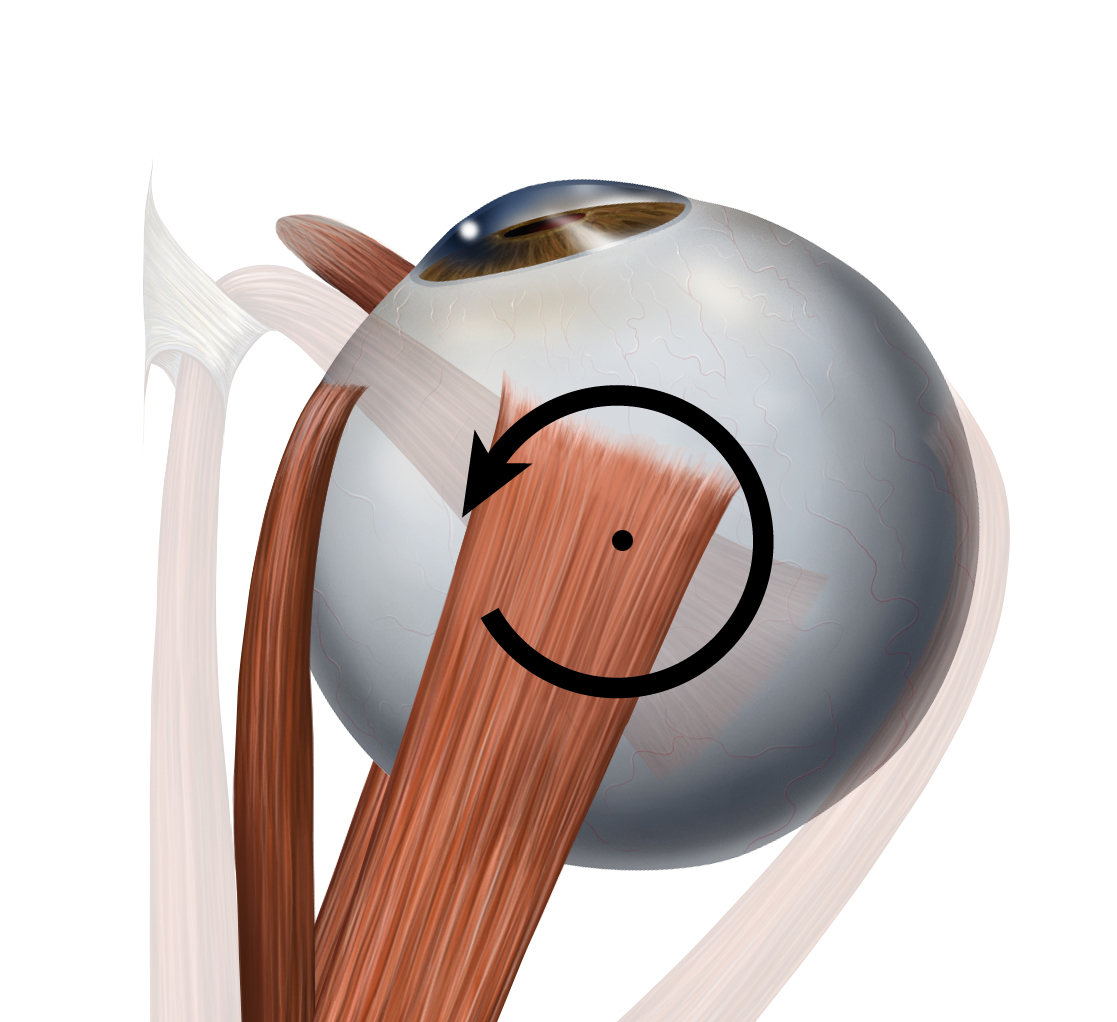
Eye movement of medial rectus muscle, superior view

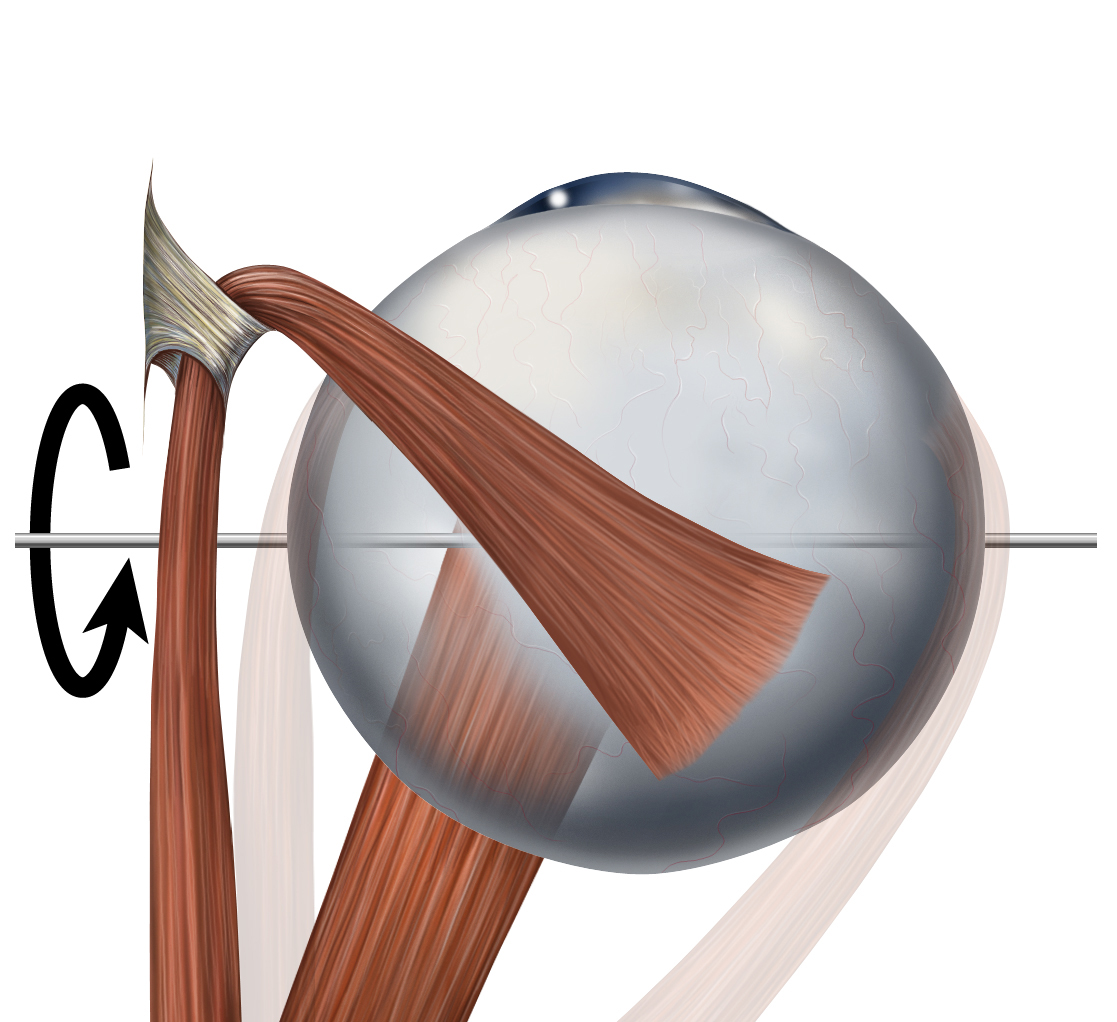
Eye movement of inferior rectus muscle, superior view

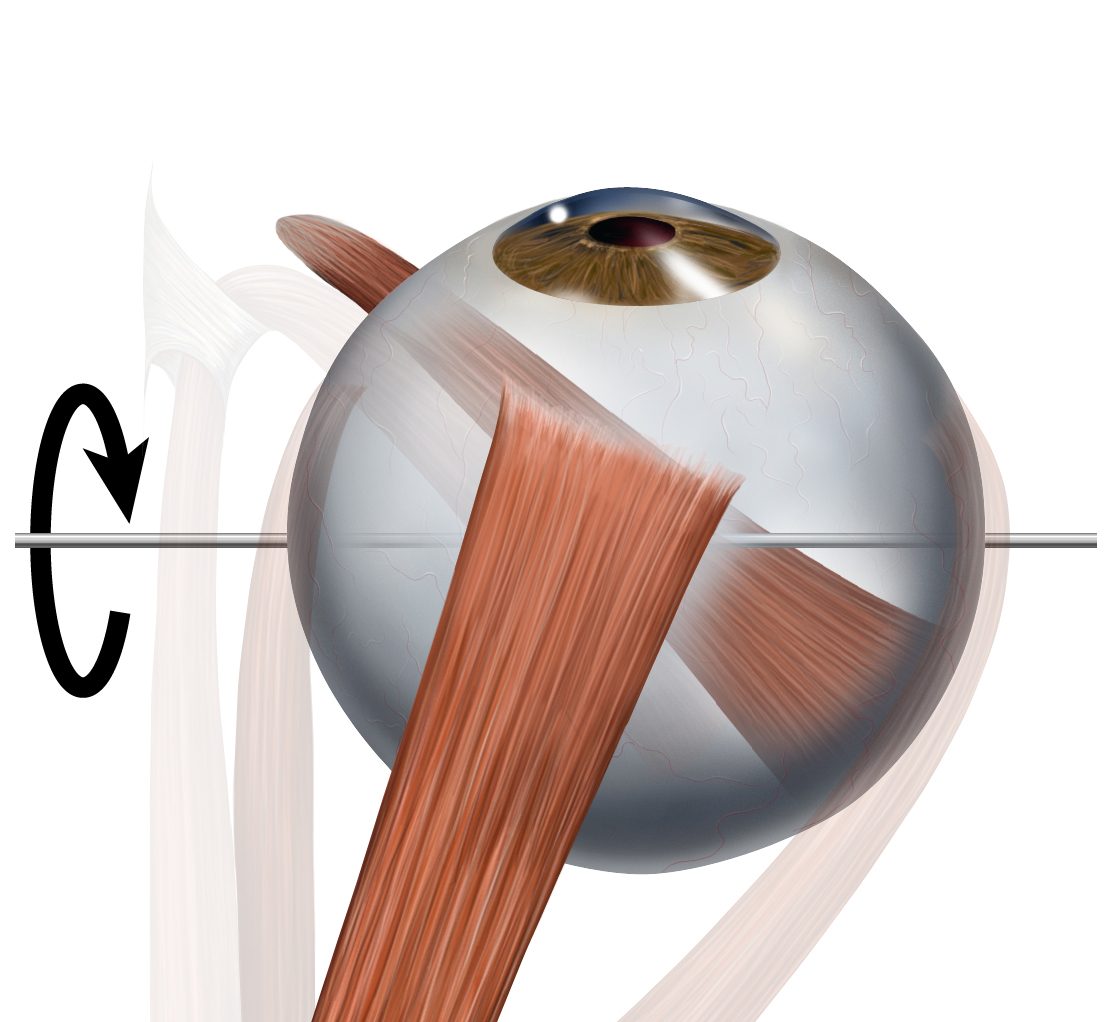
Eye movement of superior rectus muscle, superior view

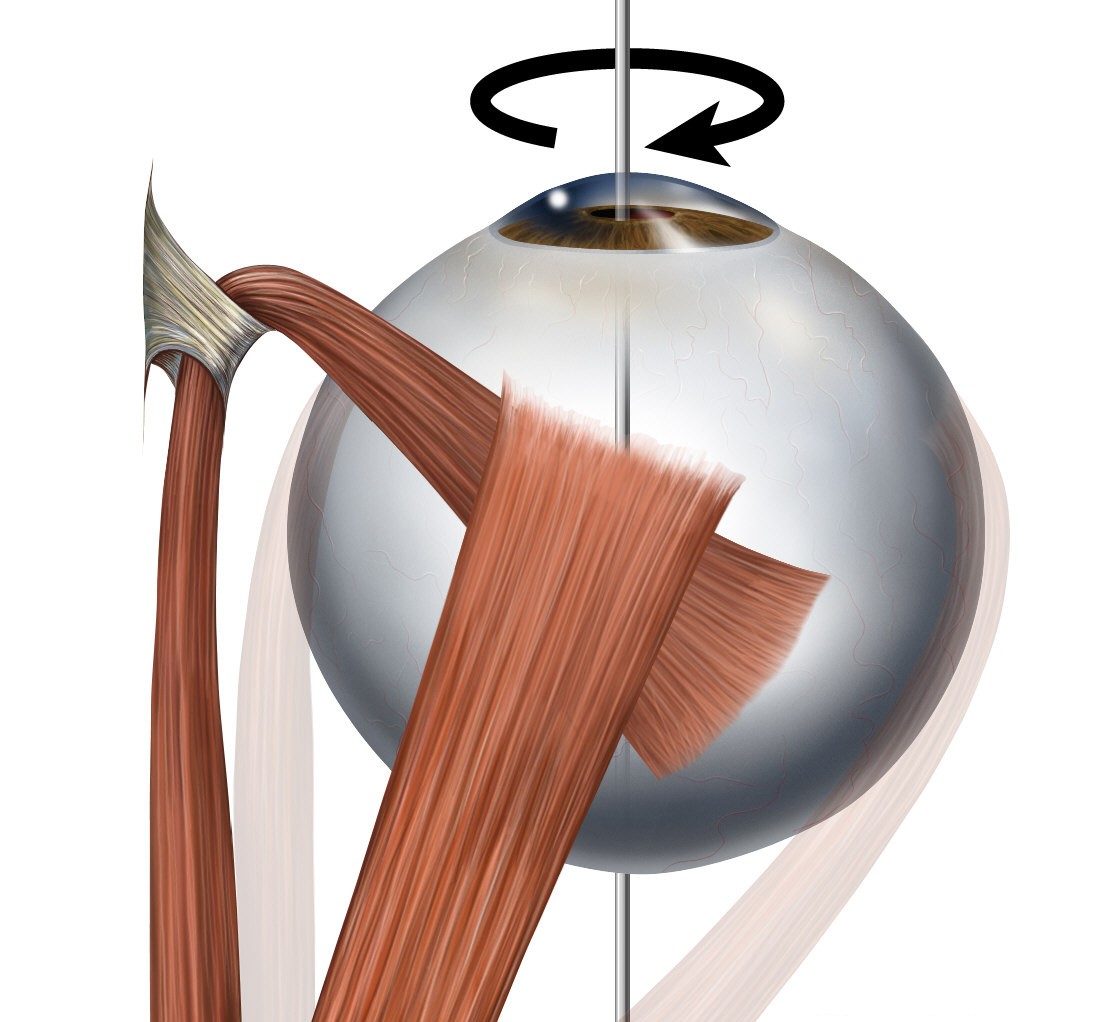
Eye movement of superior oblique muscle, superior view

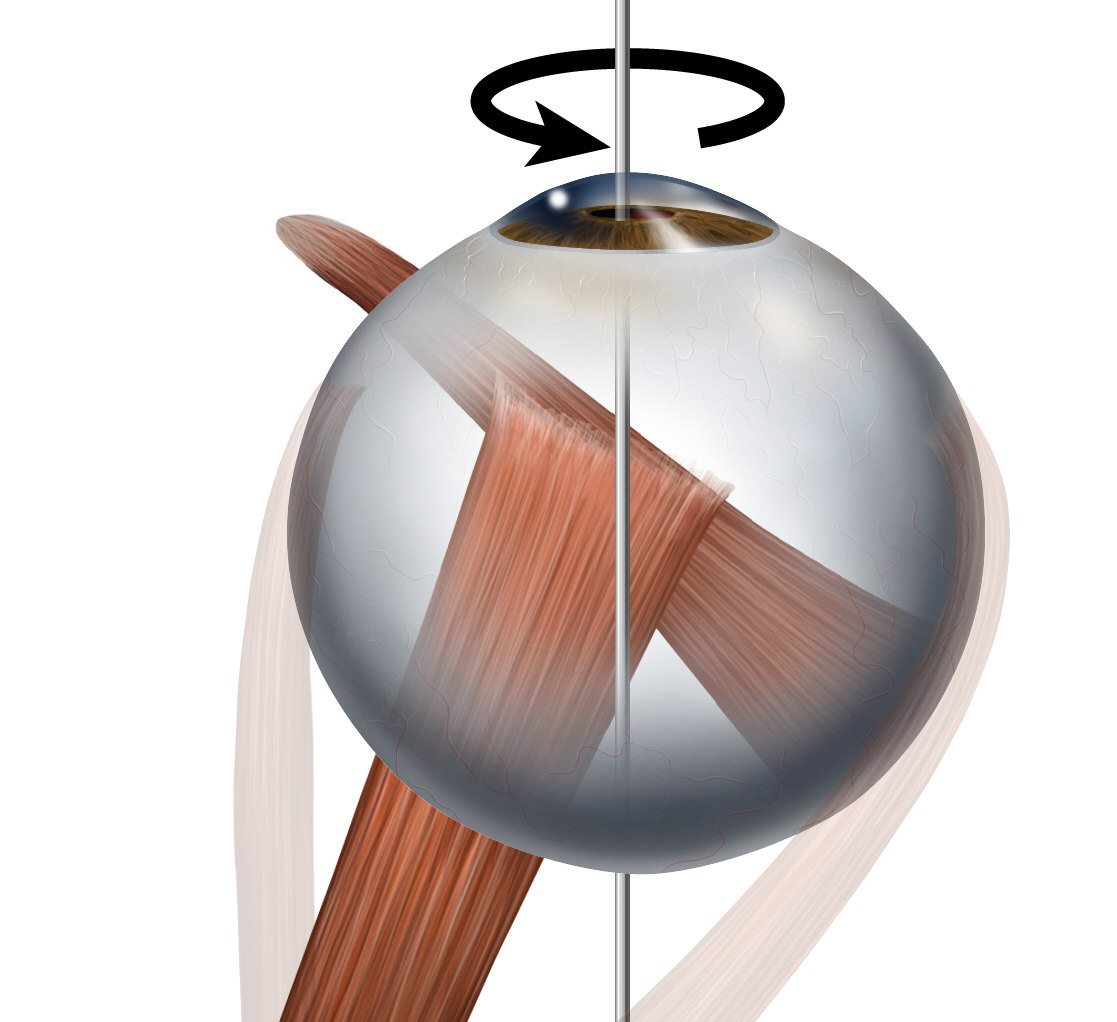
Eye movement of inferior oblique muscle, superior view

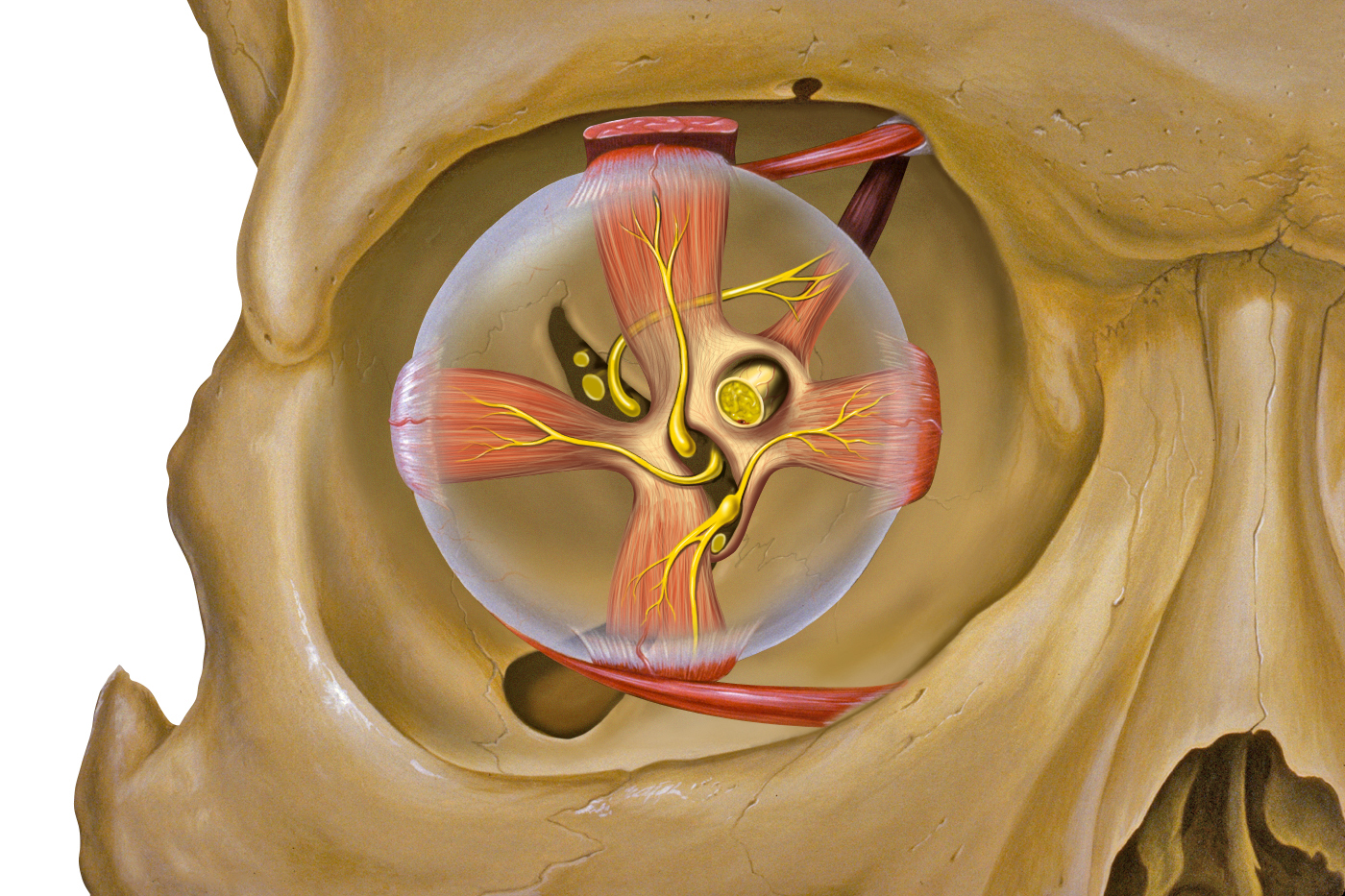
Anterior view
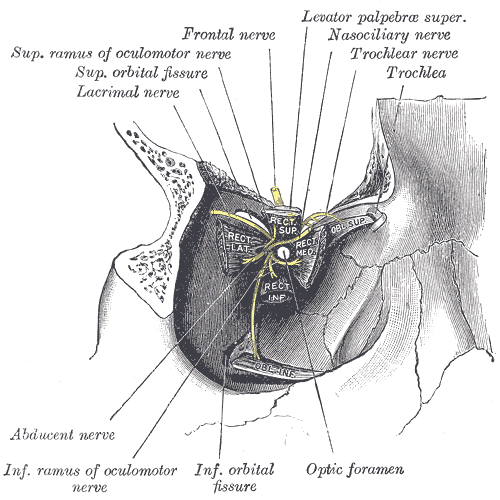
Dissection showing origins of right ocular muscles, and nerves entering by the superior orbital fissure.

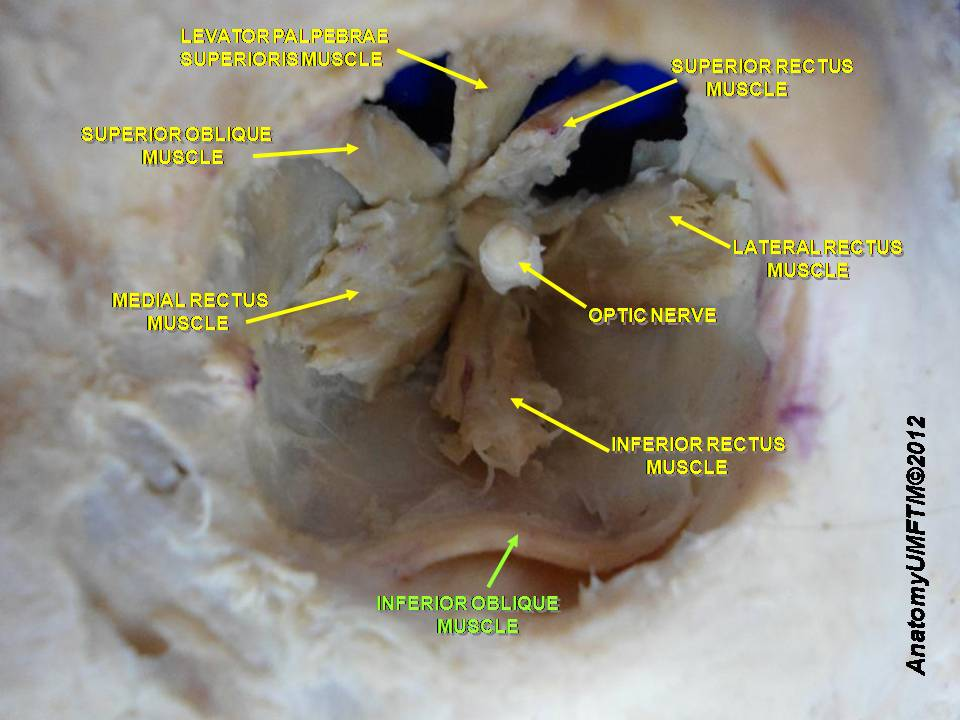
Inferior oblique muscle

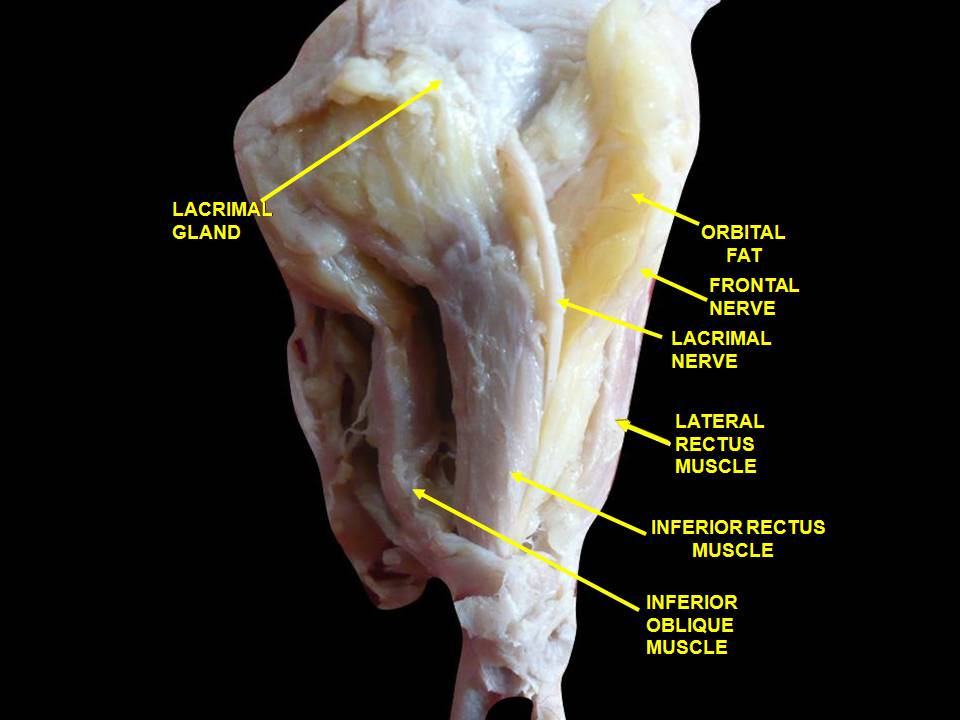
Extrinsic eye muscle. Nerves of orbita. Deep dissection.
