= Medial rectus muscle =

Extraocular muscle that rotates the eye medially

Medial rectus
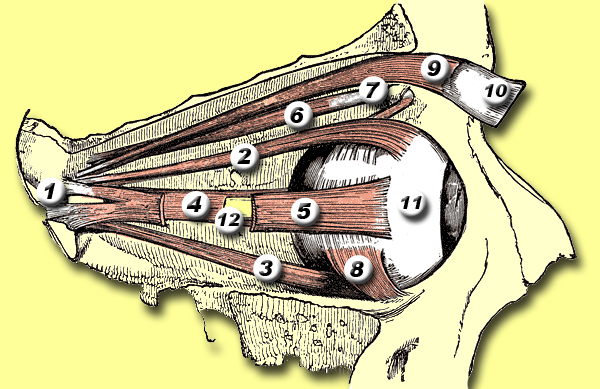
- Rectus muscles: 2 = superior, 3 = inferior, 4 = medial, 5 = lateral Oblique muscles: 6 = superior, 8 = inferior Other muscle: 9 = levator palpebrae superioris Other structures: 1 = Common tendinous ring, 7 = Trochlea, 10 = Superior tarsus, 11 = Sclera, 12 = Optic nerve

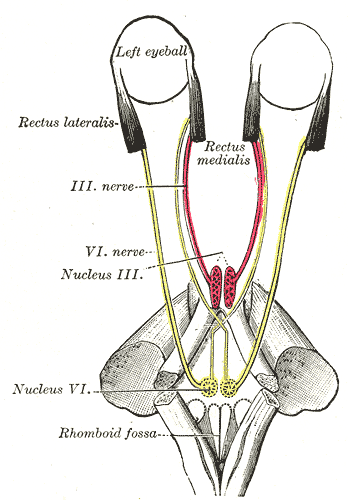
- Figure showing the mode of innervation of the recti medialis and lateralis of the eye

Details
- Origin: Common tendinous ring at the orbital apex
- Insertion: 5.5 mm medial to the limbus
- Nerve: Inferior division of the oculomotor nerve
- Actions: Adducts the eyeball (makes it move inwards)

Identifiers
- Latin: musculus rectus medialis bulbi
- TA98: A15.2.07.012
- TA2: 2044
- FMA: 49037

The medial rectus muscle is a muscle in the orbit near the eye. It is one of the extraocular muscles. It originates from the common tendinous ring, and inserts into the anteromedial surface of the eye. It is supplied by the inferior division of the oculomotor nerve (III). It rotates the eye medially (adduction).

== Structure ==
The medial rectus muscle shares an origin with several other extrinsic eye muscles, the common tendinous ring. It inserts into the anteromedial surface of the eye. This insertion has a width of around 11 mm. It is around 5.5 mm from the corneal limbus.

=== Nerve supply ===
The medial rectus muscle is supplied by the inferior division of the oculomotor nerve (III). A branch of it enters the muscle around two fifths along its length. It usually divides into 2 smaller branches, occasionally 3. These further subdivide, becoming smaller down the length of the muscle until they become imperceptible to standard staining around 17 mm from the insertion of the muscle.

=== Relations ===
The insertion of the medial rectus muscle is around 7.5 mm from the insertion of the superior rectus muscle, and around 6 mm from the inferior rectus muscle. It is shorter but stronger than the other orbital recti muscles. It rarely changes position significantly when it contracts, unlike the other extraocular muscles.

== Function ==
The medial rectus muscle rotates the eye medially (adduction). It works using a pulley system as it curves around the anterior surface of the eye.

== Clinical significance ==
=== Strabismus ===
Strabismus (lazy eye) may be caused by a medial rectus muscle that is located too high in the orbit of the skull.

Esotropia (convergent strabismus) may also be caused by sixth nerve palsy, which causes weakness or paralysis of the lateral rectus muscle. Sometimes, botulinum toxin may be injected into the medial rectus muscle. Whilst this reduces the ability to abduct and adduct the eye for tracking, it corrects the esotropia and so generally improves vision.

=== Compression ===
The medial rectus muscle lies directly adjacent to the orbit of the skull. This leaves it vulnerable to being compressed (incarcerated) during skull fractures, which can prevent movement of the eye. This usually resolves when skull fractures are fixed.

=== Surgical damage ===
The medial rectus muscle may be damaged during eye surgery or skull surgery, such as functional endoscopic sinus surgery. The damage can be minor, such as bruising, or severe, such as cutting through the muscle partially or completely, and nerve injury.

== Additional images ==
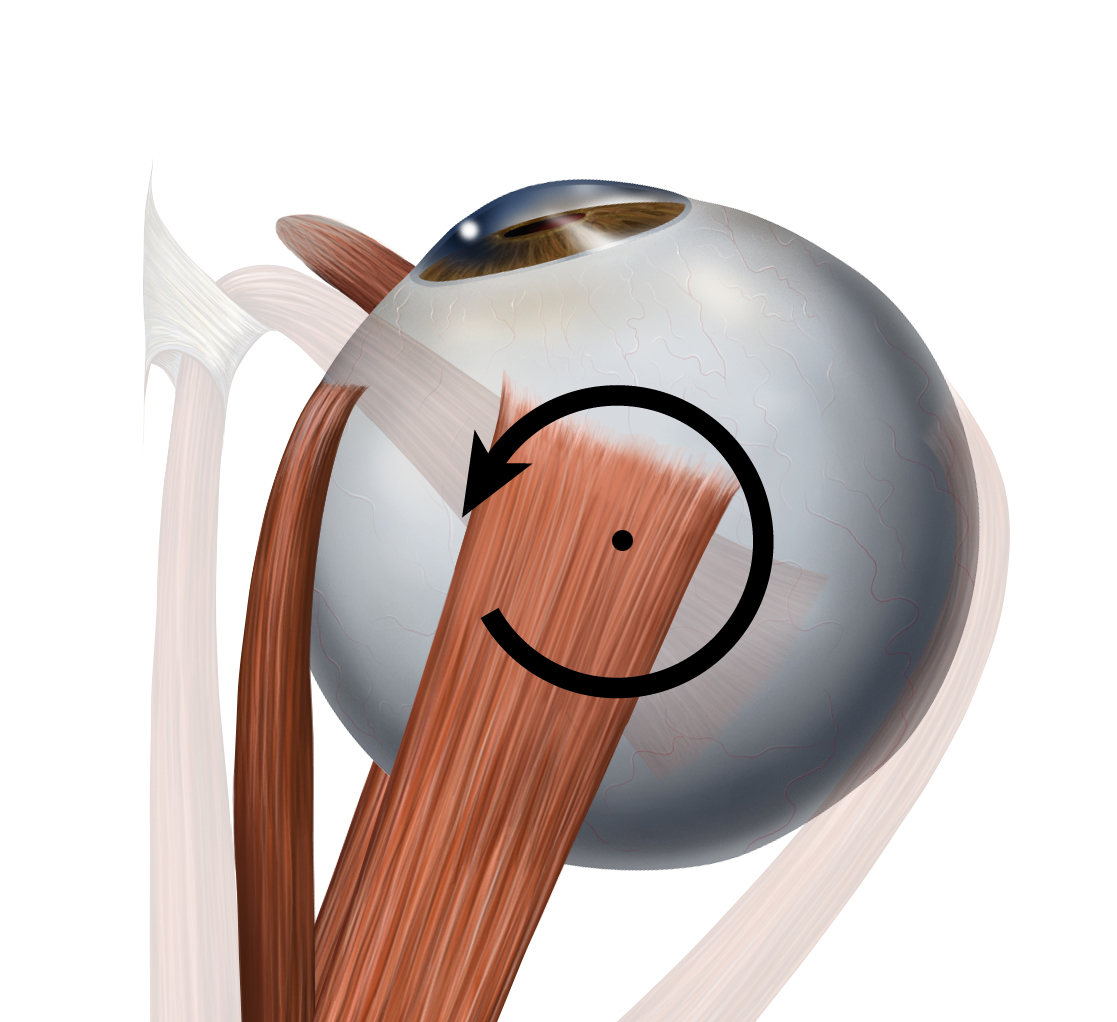
Eye movement of medial rectus muscle, superior view

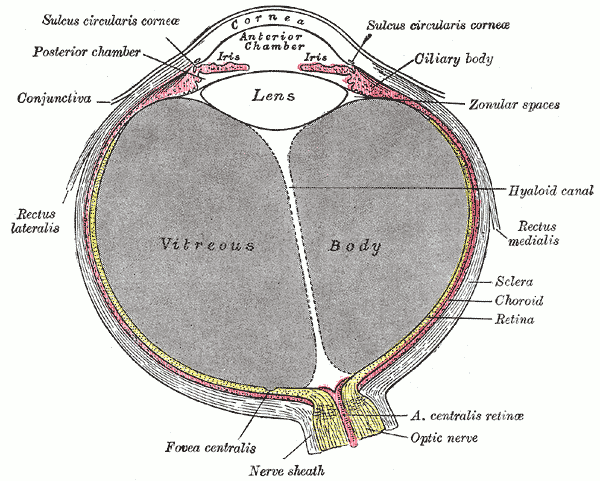
Horizontal section of the eyeball

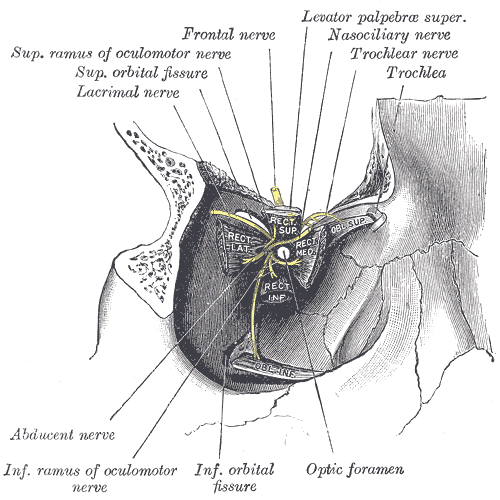
Dissection showing origins of right ocular muscles, and nerves entering by the superior orbital fissure

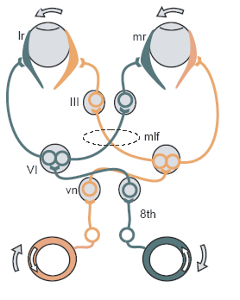
Vestibulo-ocular reflex

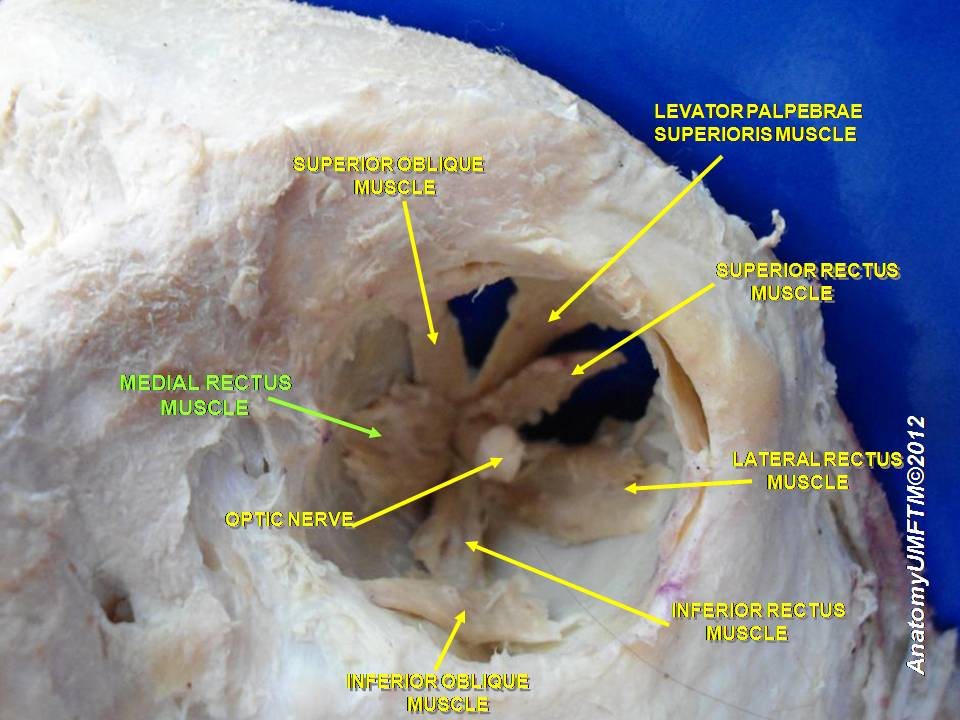
Medial rectus muscle

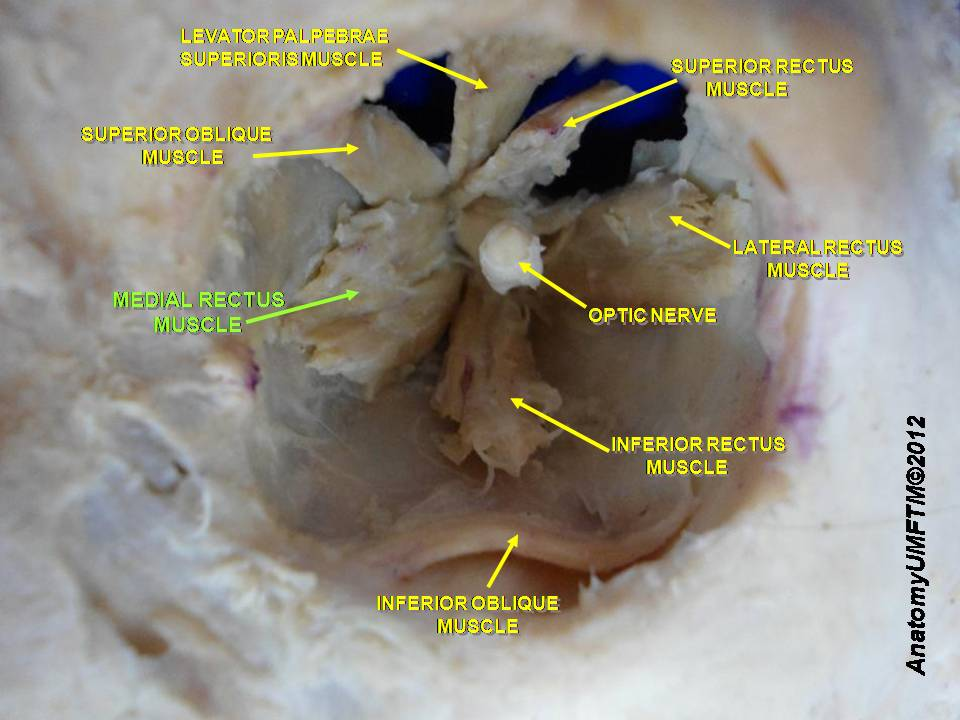
Medial rectus muscle

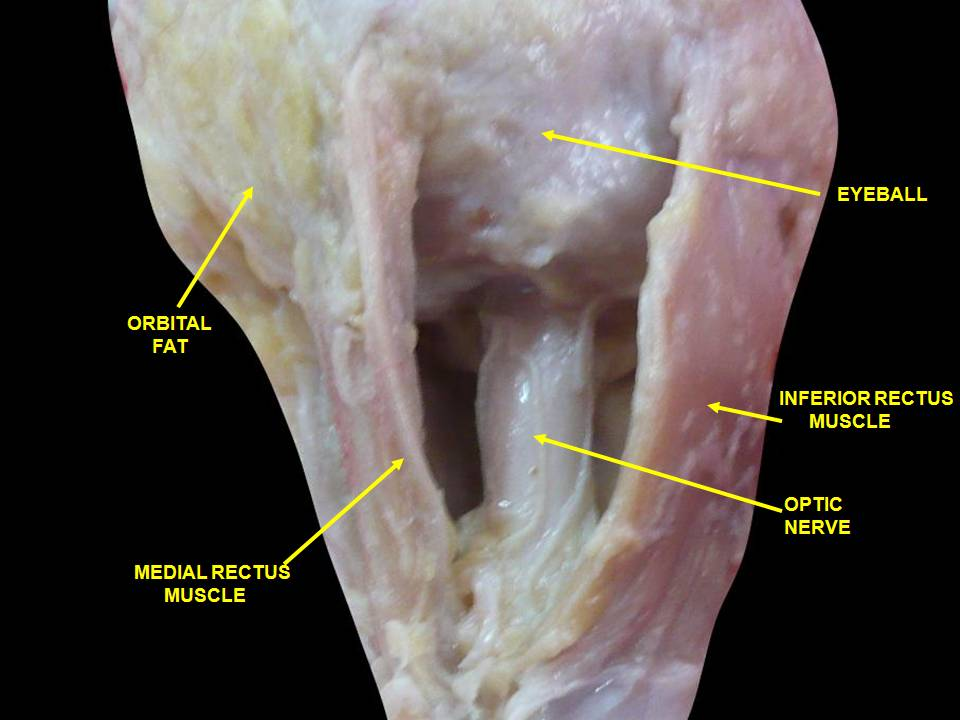
Extrinsic eye muscle. Nerves of orbita. Deep dissection.

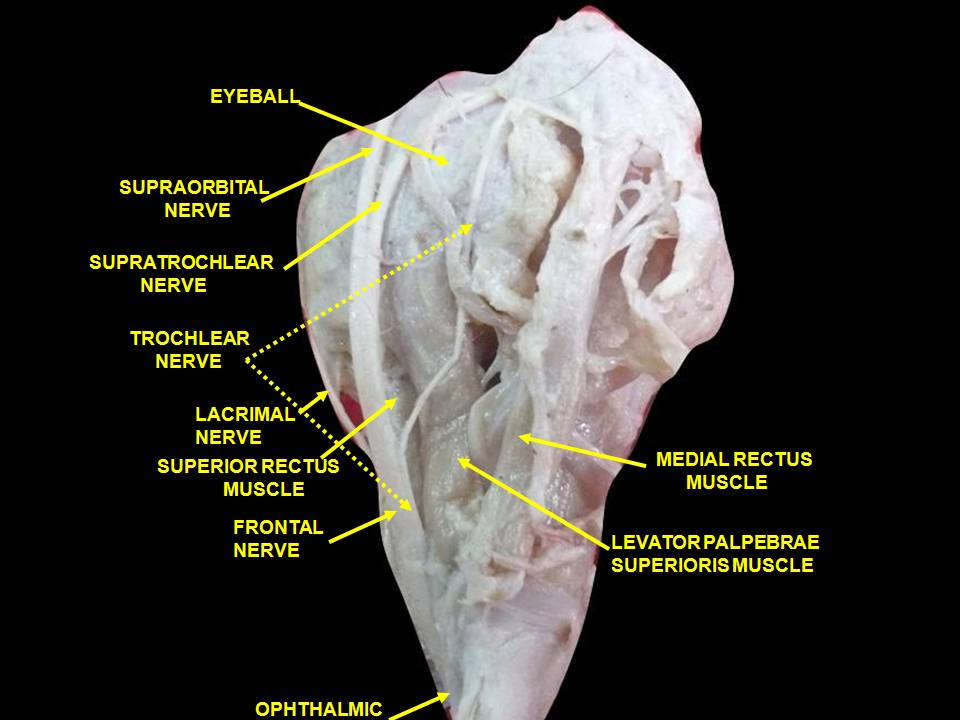
Extrinsic eye muscle. Nerves of orbita. Deep dissection.

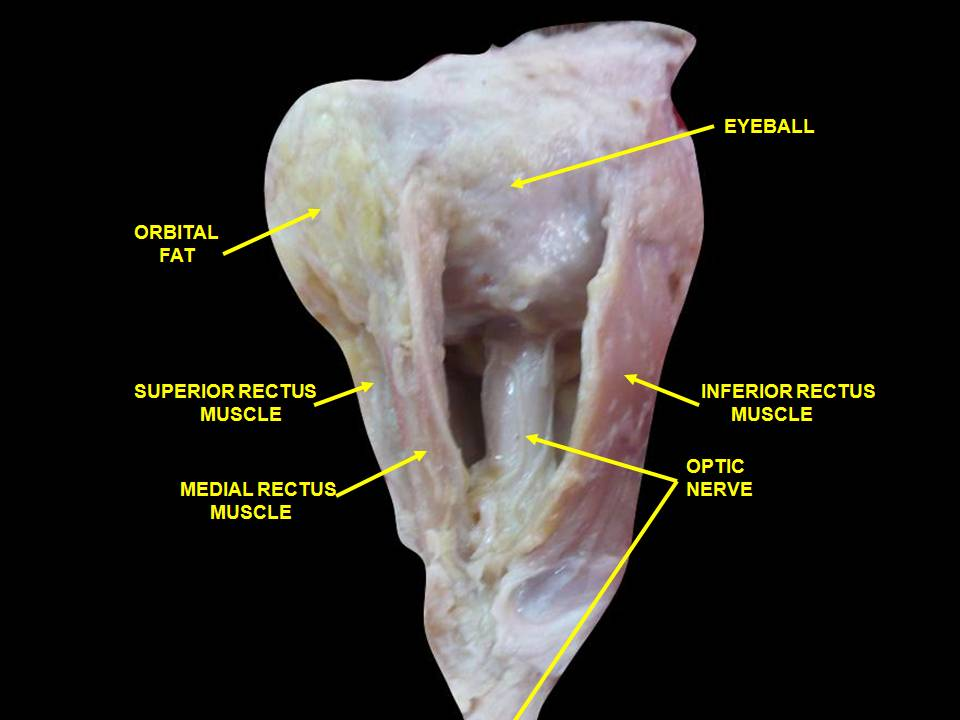
Extrinsic eye muscle. Nerves of orbita. Deep dissection.

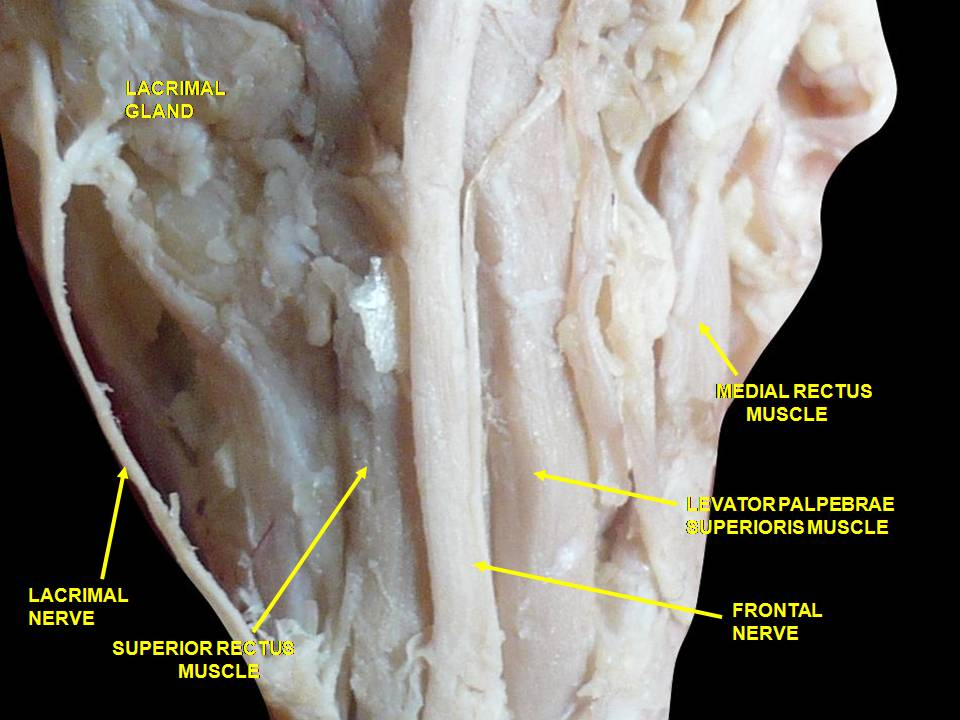
Extrinsic eye muscle. Nerves of orbita. Deep dissection.

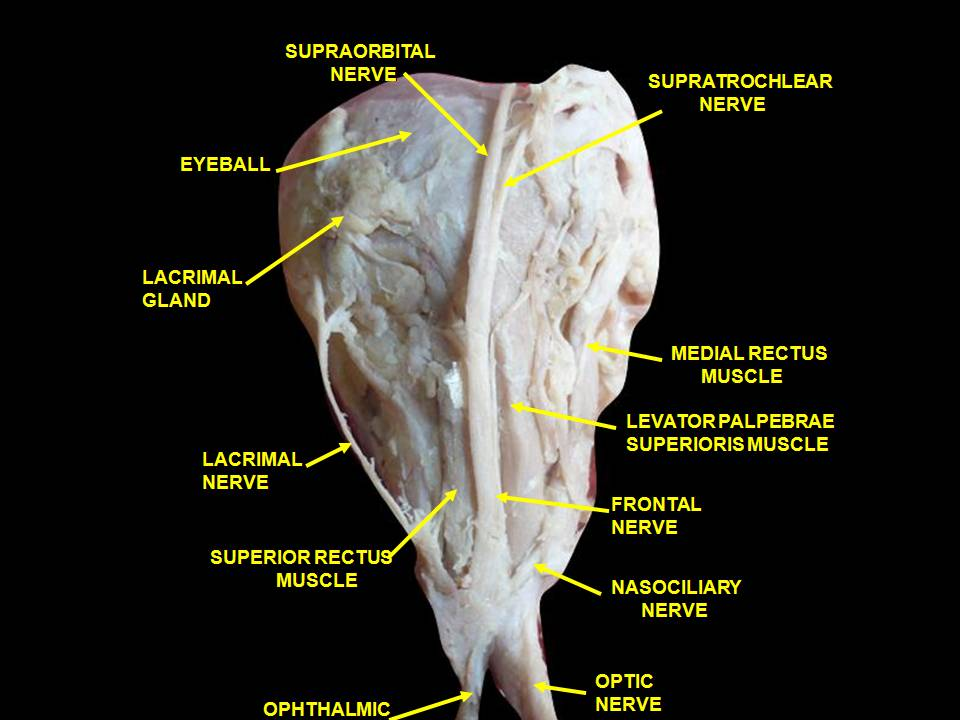
Extrinsic eye muscle. Nerves of orbita. Deep dissection.

== See also ==
- Extraocular muscles
