= Oblique muscle of eye =

Oblique muscle of eye may refer to:

- Inferior oblique muscle
- Superior oblique muscle
