= Extraocular muscles =

Seven extrinsic muscles of the eye

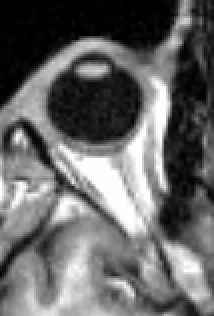
- MRI scan showing lateral rectus muscle and medial rectus muscle

Details
- System: Visual system
- Origin: Common tendinous ring, maxillary and sphenoid bone
- Insertion: Tarsal plate of upper eyelid, eye
- Artery: Ophthalmic artery, lacrimal artery, infraorbital artery, anterior ciliary arteries, superior and inferior orbital veins
- Nerve: Oculomotor, trochlear and abducens nerve
- Actions: See table

Identifiers
- Latin: musculi externi bulbi oculi
- MeSH: D009801
- TA98: A04.1.01.001
- TA2: 2041
- FMA: 49033

The extraocular muscles, or extrinsic ocular muscles, are the seven extrinsic muscles of the eye in humans and other animals. Six of the extraocular muscles, the four recti muscles, and the superior and inferior oblique muscles, control movement of the eye. The other muscle, the levator palpebrae superioris, controls eyelid elevation. The actions of the six muscles responsible for eye movement depend on the position of the eye at the time of muscle contraction.

The ciliary muscle, pupillary sphincter muscle and pupillary dilator muscle sometimes are called intrinsic ocular muscles or intraocular muscles.

== Structure ==
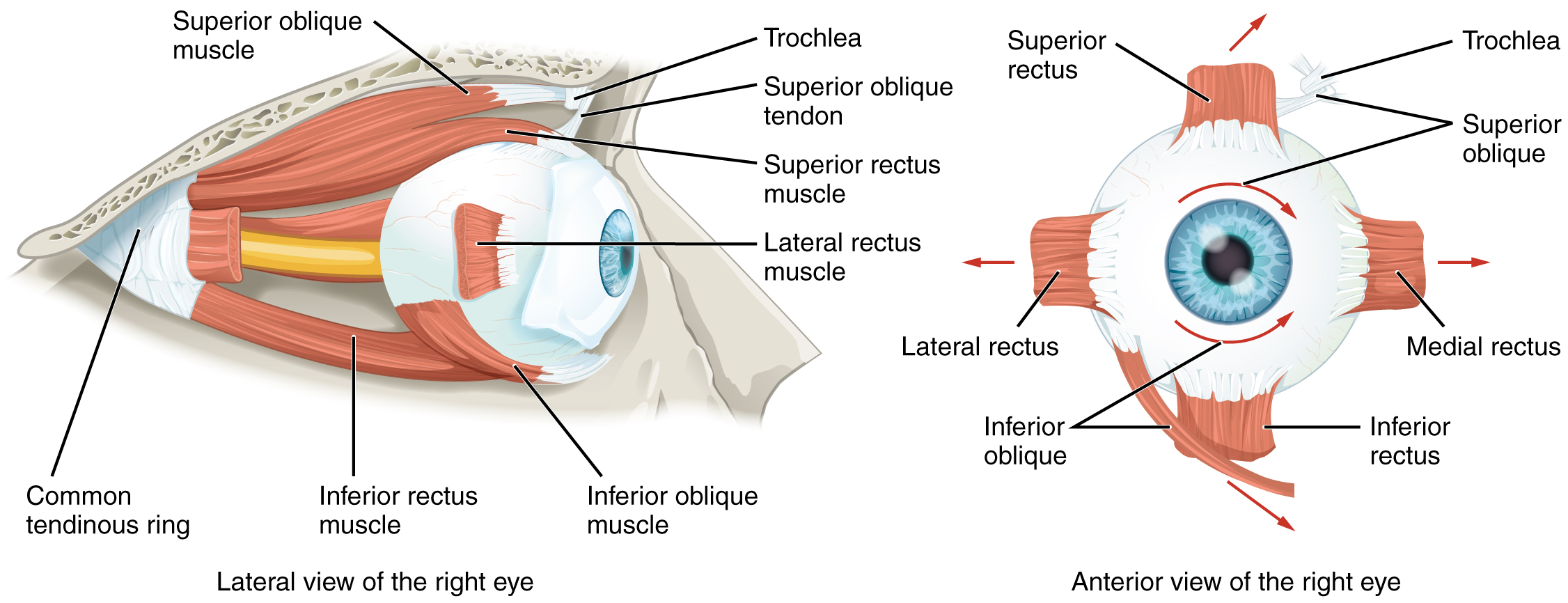
Lateral and anterior views of the extraocular muscles also showing common tendinous ring origin and trochlea

Since only a small part of the eye called the fovea provides sharp vision, the eye must move to follow a target. Eye movements must be precise and fast. This is seen in scenarios like reading, where the reader must shift gaze constantly. Although under voluntary control, most eye movement is accomplished without conscious effort. Precisely how the integration between voluntary and involuntary control of the eye occurs is a subject of continuing research. It is known, however, that the vestibulo-ocular reflex plays an important role in the involuntary movement of the eye.

The levator palpebrae superioris is responsible for raising the upper eyelid, and this can be a voluntary or involuntary action. The other six extraocular muscles are involved in movements of the eye; these are the four recti (straight) muscles, and two oblique muscles.

=== Recti muscles ===
The four recti muscles are named according to their relative positions of attachment – the superior rectus muscle, lateral rectus muscle, medial rectus muscle, and inferior rectus muscle. The recti muscles are all of almost equal length of around 40 mm but the lengths of their associated tendons differ.

=== Oblique muscles ===
The two oblique muscles are the inferior oblique muscle and the superior oblique muscle.

=== Pulley system ===
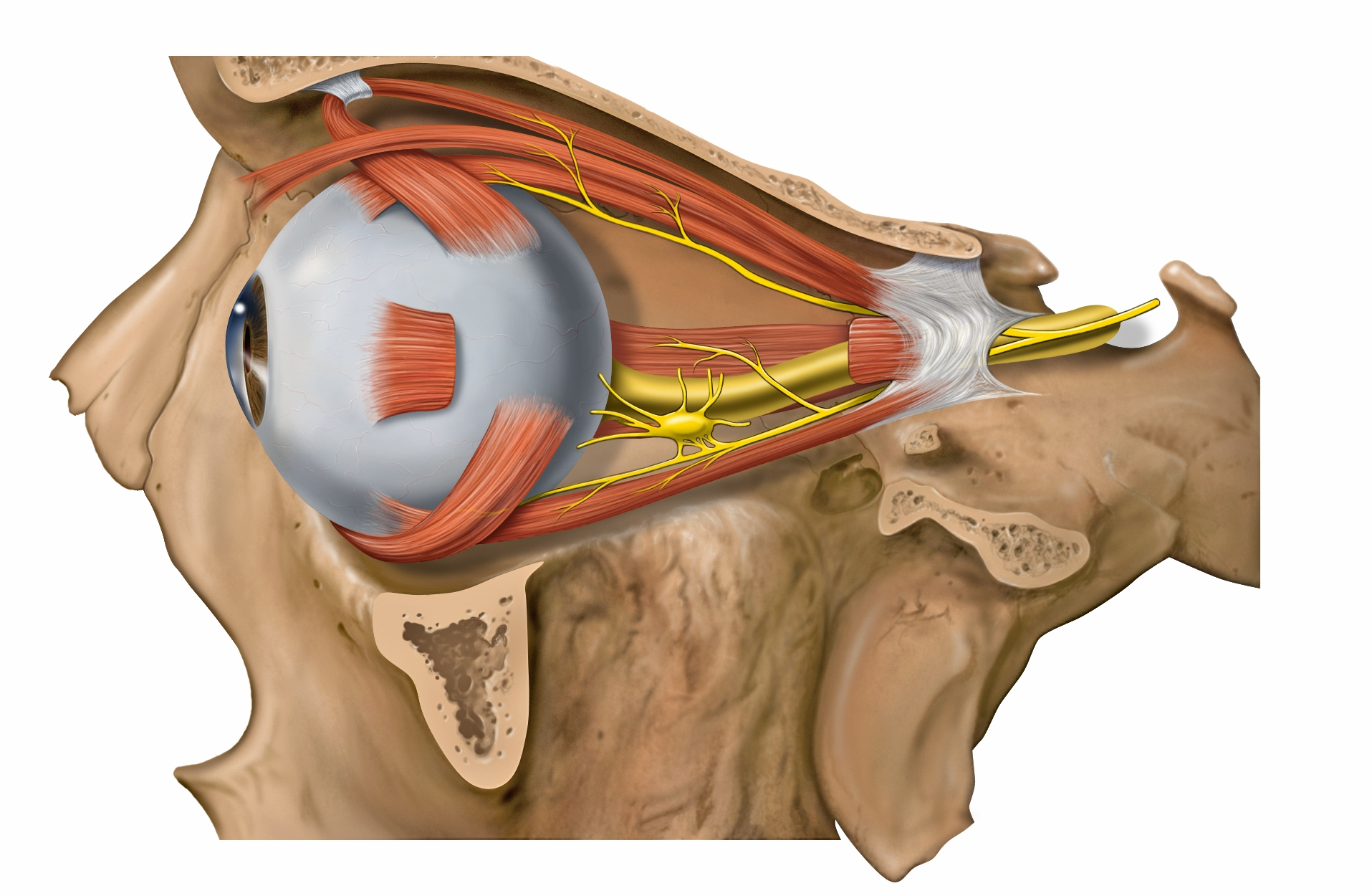
Extraocular muscles are shown in this image of the left eye (lateral view). Click on the structures for more information.

The movements of the extraocular muscles take place under the influence of a system of extraocular muscle pulleys, soft tissue pulleys in the orbit. The extraocular muscle pulley system is fundamental to the movement of the eye muscles, in particular also to ensure conformity to Listing's law. Certain diseases of the pulleys (heterotopy, instability, and hindrance of the pulleys) cause particular patterns of incomitant strabismus. Defective pulley functions can be improved by surgical interventions.

=== Origins and insertions ===
Four of the extraocular muscles have their origin in the back of the orbit in a fibrous ring called the common tendinous ring: the four recti muscles. The four recti muscles attach directly to the front half of the eye (anterior to the eye's equator), and are named after their straight paths.

Medial and lateral are relative terms. Medial indicates near the midline, and lateral describes a position away from the midline. Thus, the medial rectus is the muscle closest to the nose. The superior and inferior recti do not pull straight back on the eye, because both muscles also pull slightly medially. This posterior medial angle causes the eye to roll with contraction of either the superior rectus muscle or the inferior rectus muscle. The extent of rolling in the recti is less than the oblique, and opposite from it.

The superior oblique muscle originates at the back of the orbit (a little closer to the medial rectus, though medial to it), getting rounder as it courses forward to a rigid, cartilaginous pulley, called the trochlea, on the upper, nasal wall of the orbit. The muscle becomes tendinous about 10mm before it passes through the pulley, turning sharply across the orbit, and inserts on the lateral, posterior part of the globe. Thus, the superior oblique travels posteriorly for the last part of its path, going over the top of the eye. Due to its unique path, the superior oblique, when activated, pulls the eye downward and laterally.

The last muscle is the inferior oblique, which originates at the lower front of the nasal orbital wall, passes inferiorly over the inferior rectus muscle on its path laterally and posteriorly, and inserts under the lateral rectus muscle on the lateral, posterior part of the globe. Thus, the inferior oblique pulls the eye upward and laterally.

== Blood supply ==
The extraocular muscles are supplied mainly by branches of the ophthalmic artery. This is done either directly or indirectly, as in the lateral rectus muscle, via the lacrimal artery, a main branch of the ophthalmic artery. Additional branches of the ophthalmic artery include the ciliary arteries, which branch into the anterior ciliary arteries. Each rectus muscle receives blood from two anterior ciliary arteries, except for the lateral rectus muscle, which receives blood from only one. The exact number and arrangement of these ciliary arteries may vary. Branches of the infraorbital artery supply the inferior rectus and inferior oblique muscles.

== Nerve supply ==
Cranial nerve	Muscle
Oculomotor nerve (N. III)	Superior rectus muscle Inferior rectus muscle Medial rectus muscle Inferior oblique muscle
Oculomotor nerve (N. III)	Levator palpebrae superioris muscle
Trochlear nerve (N. IV)	Superior oblique muscle
Abducens nerve (N. VI)	Lateral rectus muscle

The nuclei or bodies of these nerves are found in the brain stem. The nuclei of the abducens and oculomotor nerves are connected. This is important in coordinating the motion of the lateral rectus in one eye and the medial action on the other. In one eye, in two antagonistic muscles, like the lateral and medial recti, contraction of one leads to inhibition of the other. Muscles show small degrees of activity even when resting, keeping the muscles taut. This "tonic" activity is brought on by discharges of the motor nerve to the muscle.

== Development ==
The extraocular muscles develop along with Tenon's capsule (part of the ligaments) and the fatty tissue of the eye socket (orbit). There are three centers of growth that are important in the development of the eye, and each is associated with a nerve. Hence the subsequent nerve supply (innervation) of the eye muscles is from three cranial nerves. The development of the extraocular muscles is dependent on the normal development of the eye socket, while the formation of the ligament is fully independent.

== Function ==
=== Eye movement ===
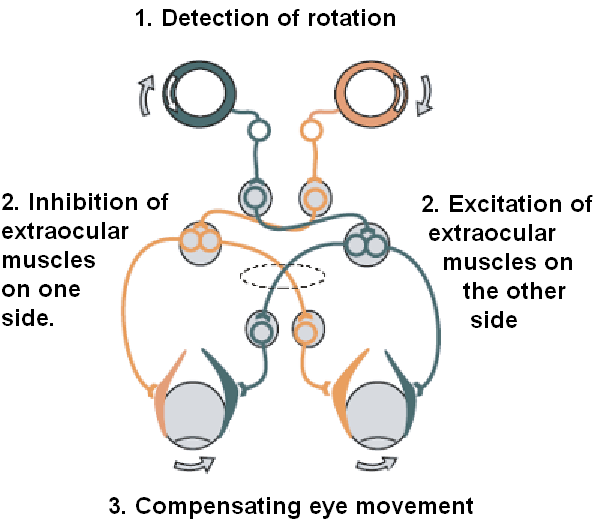
The vestibulo-ocular reflex. A rotation of the head is detected, which triggers an inhibitory signal to the extraocular muscles on one side and an excitatory signal to the muscles on the other side. The result is a compensatory movement of the eyes.

The oculomotor nerve (III), trochlear nerve (IV) and abducens nerve (VI) coordinate eye movement. The oculomotor nerve controls all muscles of the eye except for the superior oblique muscle controlled by the trochlear nerve (IV), and the lateral rectus muscle controlled by the abducens nerve (VI). This means the ability of the eye to look down and inwards is controlled by the trochlear nerve (IV), the ability to look outwards is controlled by the abducens nerve (VI), and all other movements are controlled by the oculomotor nerve (III).

==== Movement coordination ====
Intermediate directions are controlled by simultaneous actions of multiple muscles. When one shifts the gaze horizontally, one eye will move laterally (toward the side) and the other will move medially (toward the midline). This may be neurally coordinated by the central nervous system, to make the eyes move together and almost involuntarily. This is a key factor in the study of strabismus, namely, the inability of the eyes to be directed to one point.

There are two main kinds of movement: conjugate movement (the eyes move in the same direction) and disjunctive (opposite directions). The former is typical when shifting gaze right or left, the latter is convergence of the two eyes on a near object. Disjunction can be performed voluntarily, but is usually triggered by the nearness of the target object. A "see-saw" movement, namely, one eye looking up and the other down, is possible, but not voluntarily; this effect is brought on by putting a prism in front of one eye, so the relevant image is apparently displaced. To avoid double vision from non-corresponding points, the eye with the prism must move up or down, following the image passing through the prism. Likewise conjugate torsion (rolling) on the anteroposterior axis (from the front to the back) can occur naturally, such as when one tips one's head to one shoulder; the torsion, in the opposite direction, keeps the image vertical.

The muscles show little inertia - a shutdown of one muscle is not due to checking of the antagonist, so the motion is not ballistic.

==== Compensatory movements ====
The vestibulo-ocular reflex is a reflex that stabilizes gaze when the head is moved. The reflex involves compensatory eye movements driven by inhibitory and excitatory signals.

=== Table ===
Below is a table of each extraocular muscle and their innervation, origins and insertions, and the primary actions of the muscles (the secondary and tertiary actions are also included, where applicable).

Muscle	Innervation	Origin	Insertion	Primary action	Secondary action	Tertiary action
Medial rectus	Oculomotor nerve (inferior branch)	Annulus of Zinn	Eye (anterior, medial surface)	Adduction		
Lateral rectus	Abducens nerve	Annulus of Zinn	Eye (anterior, lateral surface)	Abduction		
Superior rectus	Oculomotor nerve (superior branch)	Annulus of Zinn	Eye (anterior, superior surface)	Elevation	Incyclotorsion	Adduction
Inferior rectus	Oculomotor nerve (inferior branch)	Annulus of Zinn	Eye (anterior, inferior surface)	Depression	Excyclotorsion	Adduction
Superior oblique	Trochlear nerve	Sphenoid bone via the trochlea	Eye (posterior, superior, lateral surface)	Incyclotorsion	Depression	Abduction
Inferior oblique	Oculomotor nerve (inferior branch)	Maxillary bone	Eye (posterior, inferior, lateral surface)	Excyclotorsion	Elevation	Abduction
Levator palpebrae superioris	Oculomotor nerve (superior branch) and sympathetic	Sphenoid bone	Tarsal plate of upper eyelid	Elevation/retraction of the upper eyelid		

== Clinical significance ==
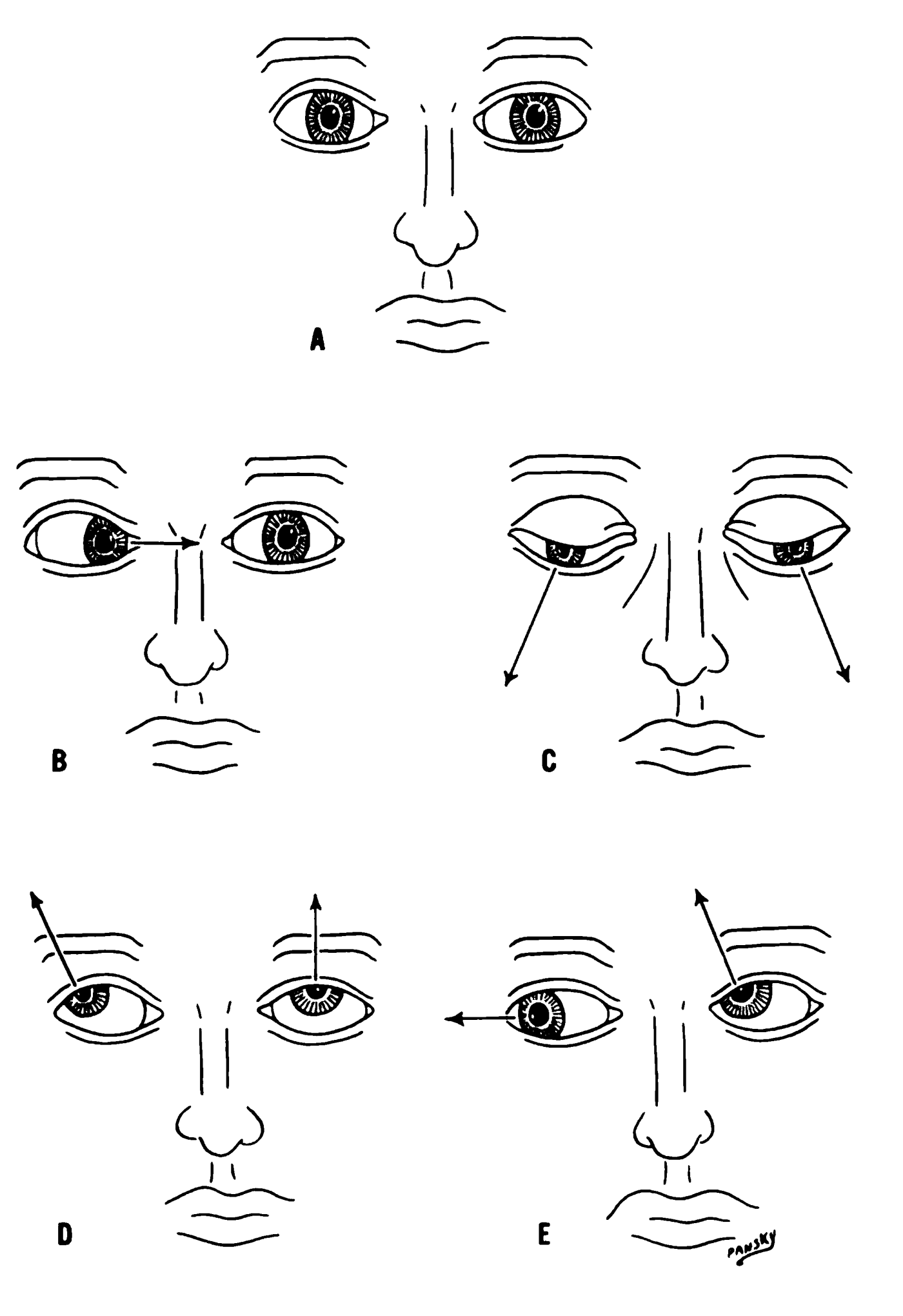
The oculomotor (III), troclear (IV) and abducens (VI) nerves supply the muscle of the eye. Damage will affect the movement of the eye in various ways, shown here.

Damage to the cranial nerves may affect the movement of the eye. Damage may result in double vision (diplopia) because the movements of the eyes are not synchronized. Abnormalities of visual movement may also be seen on examination, such as jittering (nystagmus).

Damage to the oculomotor nerve (III) can cause double vision and inability to coordinate the movements of both eyes (strabismus), also eyelid drooping (ptosis) and pupil dilation (mydriasis). Lesions may also lead to inability to open the eye due to paralysis of the levator palpebrae muscle. Individuals suffering from a lesion to the oculomotor nerve may compensate by tilting their heads to alleviate symptoms due to paralysis of one or more of the eye muscles it controls.

Damage to the trochlear nerve (IV) can also cause double vision with the eye adducted and elevated. The result will be an eye which can not move downwards properly (especially downwards when in an inward position). This is due to impairment in the superior oblique muscle.

Damage to the abducens nerve (VI) can also result in double vision. This is due to impairment in the lateral rectus muscle, supplied by the abducens nerve.

Amblyopia also known as lazy eye is a condition of diminished sight in one eye.

Ophthalmoparesis is weakness or paralysis of one or more extraocular muscles.

=== Examination ===
The initial clinical examination of the extraocular eye muscles is done by examining the movement of the globe of the eye through the six cardinal eye movements. When the eye is turned out (temporally) and horizontally, the function of the lateral rectus muscle is tested. When the eye is turned in (nasally) and horizontally, the function of the medial rectus muscle is being tested. When turning the eye down and in, the inferior rectus is contracting. When turning it up and in the superior rectus is contracting. Paradoxically, turning the eye up and out uses the inferior oblique muscle, and turning it down and out uses the superior oblique. All of these six movements can be tested by drawing a large "H" in the air with a finger or other object in front of a patient's face and having them follow the tip of the finger or object with their eyes without moving their head. Having them focus on the object as it is moved in toward their face in the midline will test convergence, or the eyes' ability to turn inward simultaneously to focus on a near object.

To evaluate for weakness or imbalance of the muscles, a penlight is shone directly on the corneas. Expected normal results of the corneal light reflex is when the penlight's reflection is located in the centre of both corneas, equally.

== Gallery ==
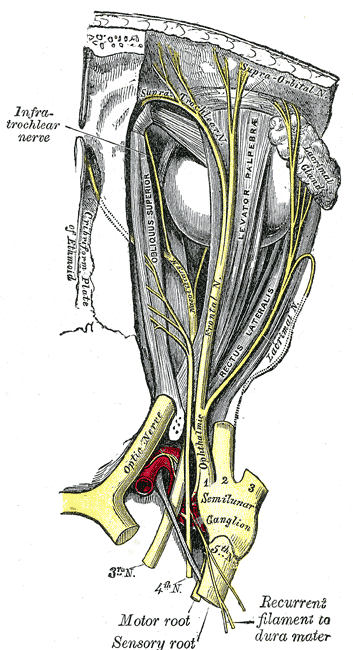
Nerves of the orbit. Seen from above.

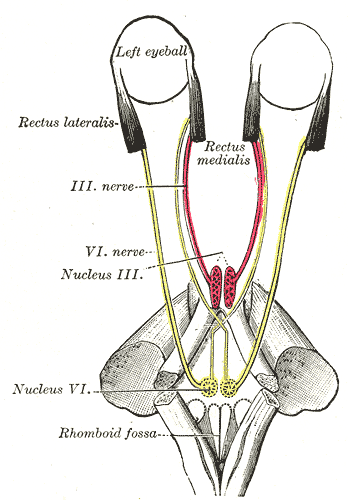
Figure showing the mode of innervation of the Recti medialis and lateralis of the eye

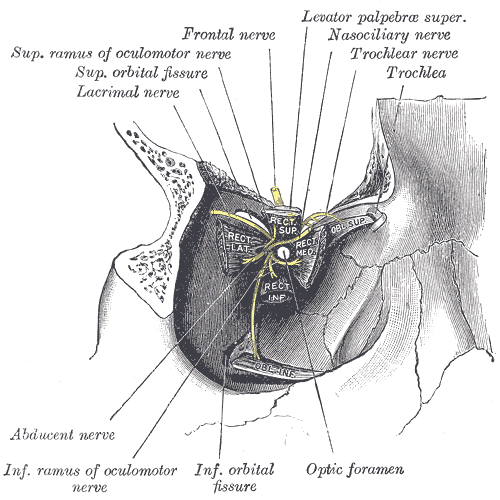
Dissection showing origins of right ocular muscles, and nerves entering by the superior orbital fissure

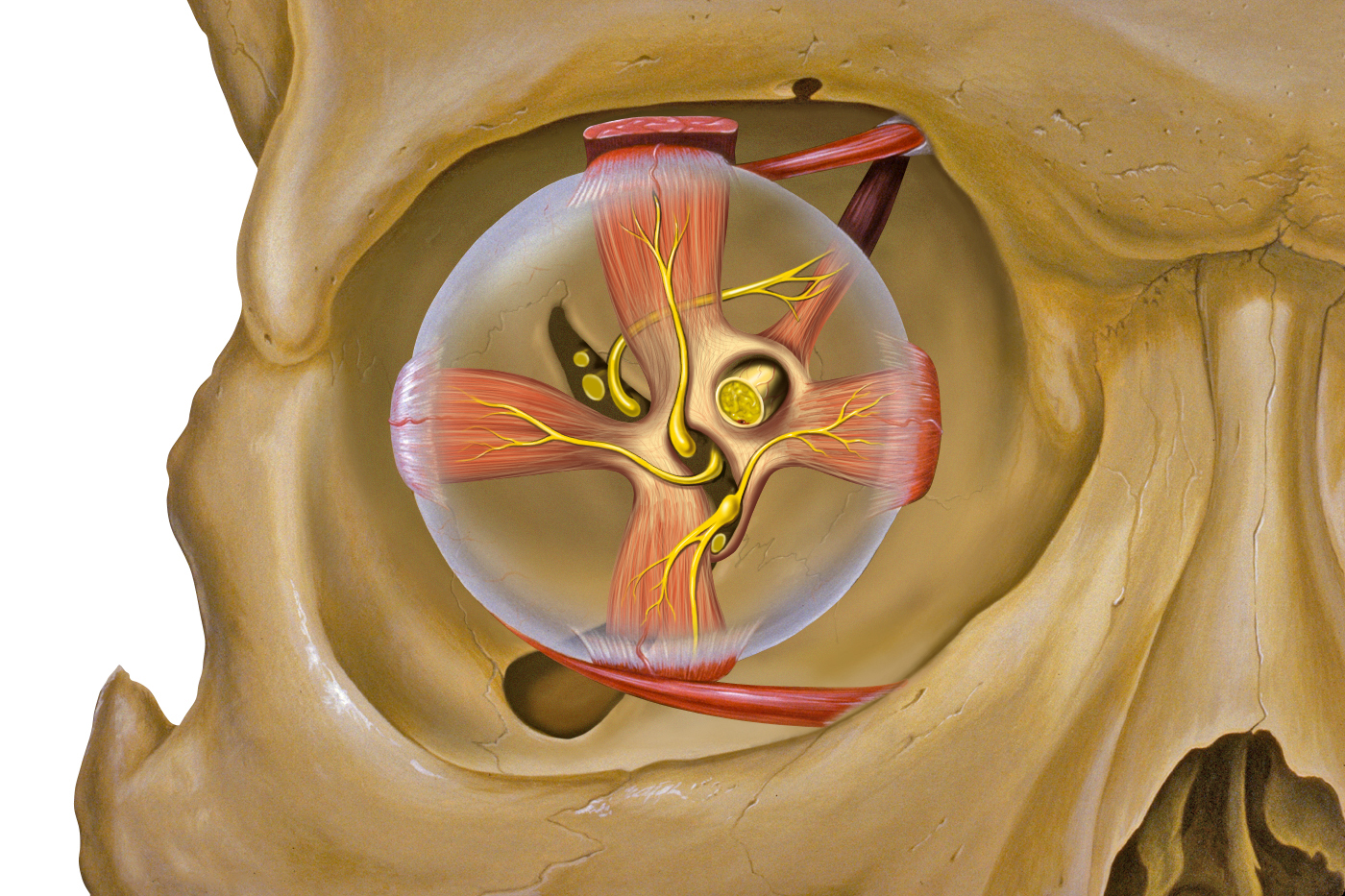
View of the orbit from the front, with nerves and extraocular muscles

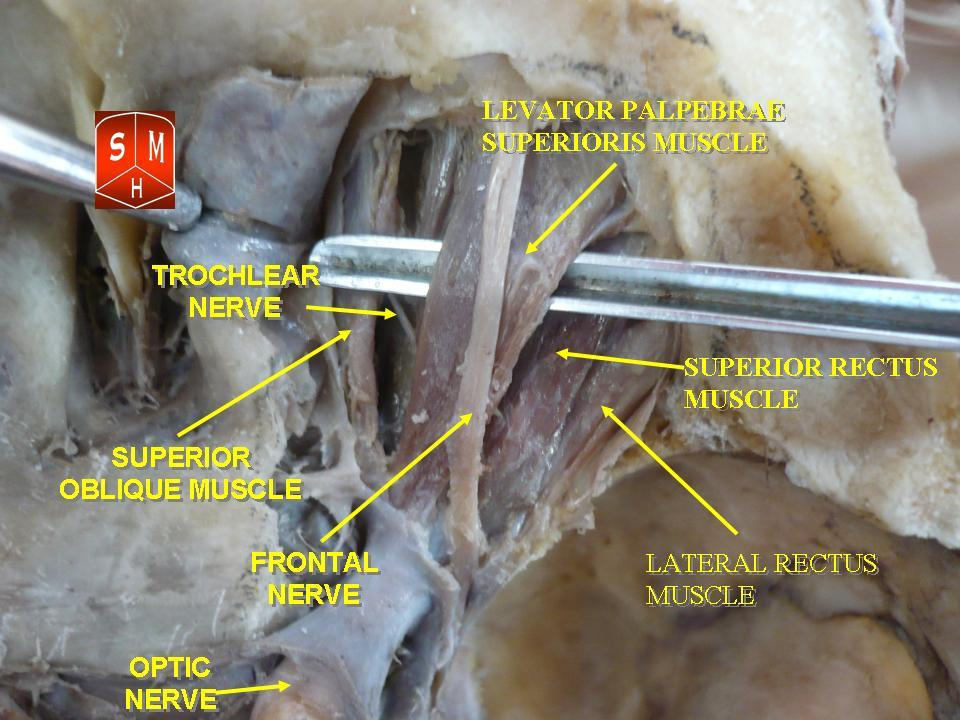
Extraocular muscles

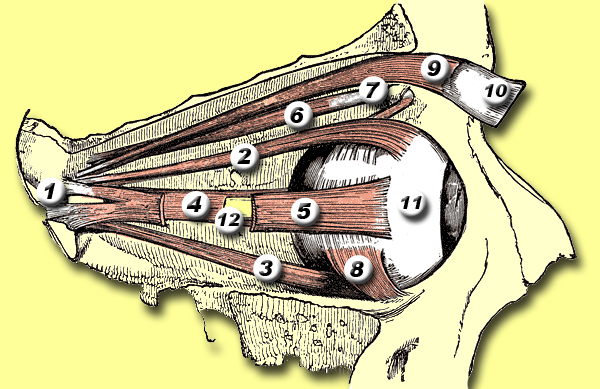

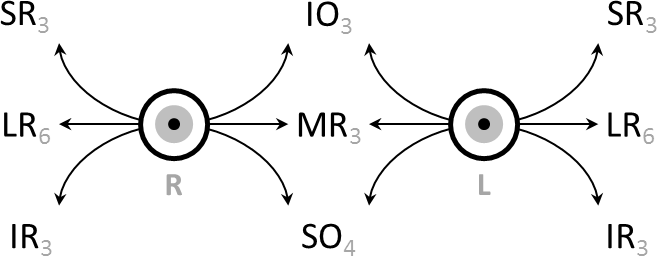
Schematic demonstrating the actions and cranial nerve innervation (in subscript) of extraocular muscles

== See also ==
- ALS#Late stages
- Hering's law of equal innervation
- Park's three-step test
- Sherrington's law of reciprocal innervation
- Spiral of Tillaux
