= Common tendinous ring =

Ring of fibrous tissue around optic nerve at its entrance to the eye

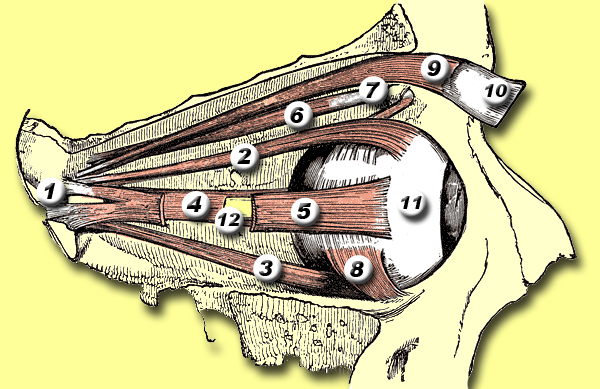
- Rectus muscles: 2 = superior, 3 = inferior, 4 = medial, 5 = lateral Oblique muscles: 6 = superior, 8 = inferior Other muscle: 9 = levator palpebrae superioris Other structures: 1 = Common tendinous ring, 7 = Trochlea, 10 = Superior tarsus, 11 = Sclera, 12 = Optic nerve

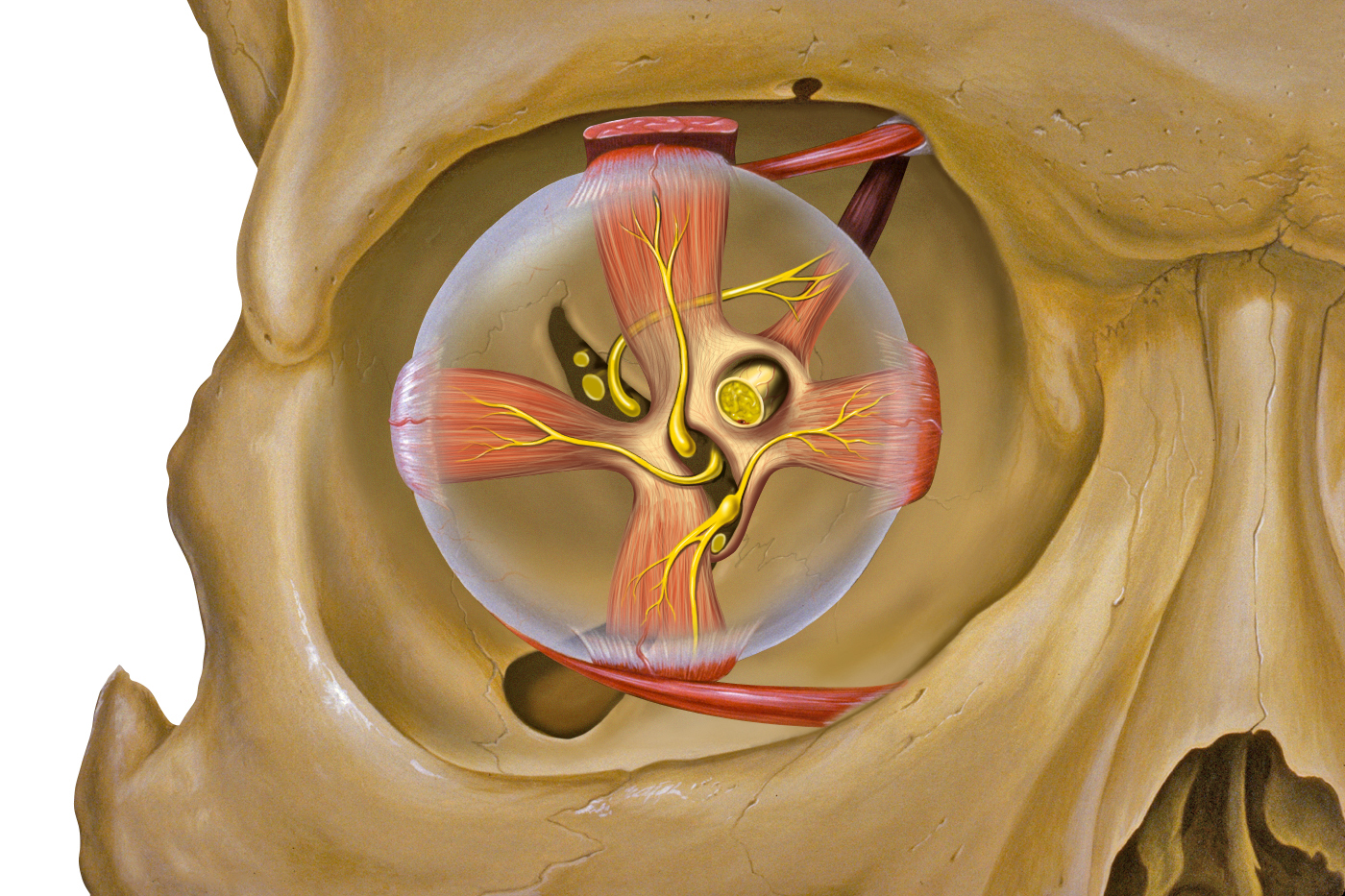
- Anterior view

Details

Identifiers
- Latin: anulus tendineus communis
- TA98: A15.2.07.015
- TA2: 2047
- FMA: 49071

The common tendinous ring, also known as the annulus of Zinn or annular tendon, is a ring of fibrous tissue surrounding the optic nerve at its entrance at the apex of the orbit. It is the common origin of the four recti muscles of the group of extraocular muscles.

It can be used to divide the regions of the superior orbital fissure.

The arteries surrounding the optic nerve form a vascular structure known as the circle of Zinn-Haller, or sometimes as the circle of Zinn.

The following structures pass through the tendinous ring (superior to inferior):

- Superior division of the oculomotor nerve (CN III)
- Nasociliary nerve (branch of ophthalmic nerve)
- Inferior division of the oculomotor nerve (CN III)
- Abducens nerve (CN VI)
- Optic nerve

== Parts ==
The common tendinous ring spans the superior orbital fissure and can be described as having two parts – an inferior tendon which gives origin to the inferior rectus muscle, and to part of the lateral rectus muscle; and a superior tendon which gives origin to the superior rectus muscle, and to part of the medial and lateral recti muscles.

== Eponym ==
It is named for Johann Gottfried Zinn. It should not be confused with the zonule of Zinn, though it is named after the same person.
