= Superior rectus muscle =

Extraocular muscle that elevates the eye

Superior rectus
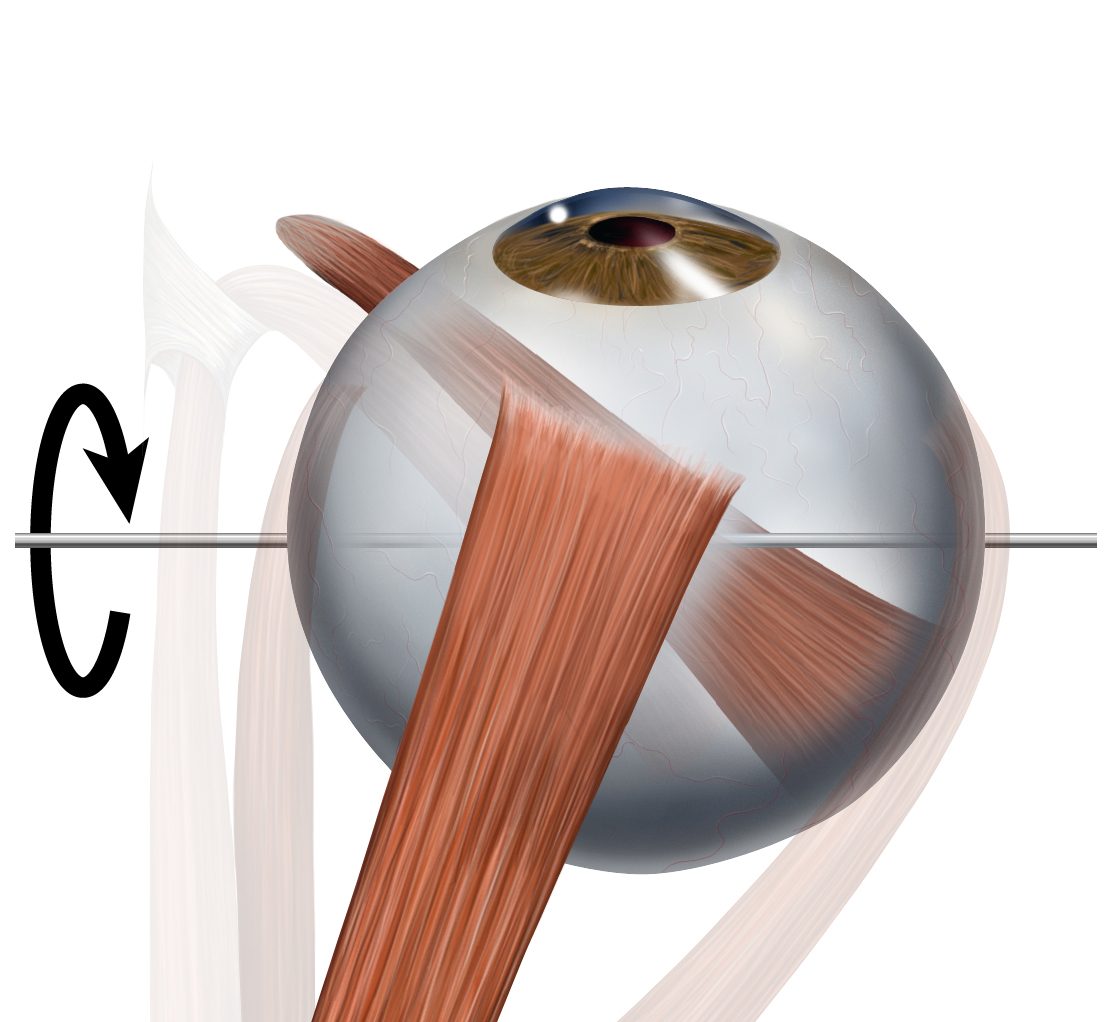
- View of the eye from above, showing the action of the superior rectus muscle.

Details
- Origin: Annulus of Zinn at the orbital apex
- Insertion: 7.9 mm superior to the corneal limbus
- Nerve: Oculomotor nerve
- Actions: Elevation, adduction, intorsion

Identifiers
- Latin: musculus rectus superior bulbi
- TA98: A15.2.07.010
- TA2: 2042
- FMA: 49035

The superior rectus muscle is one of the extraocular muscles located in the orbit. It is innervated by the superior division of the oculomotor nerve (III). In the primary position (looking straight ahead), its primary function is elevation, although it also contributes to intorsion and adduction. It is associated with a number of medical conditions, and may be weak, paralysed, overreactive, or even congenitally absent in some people.

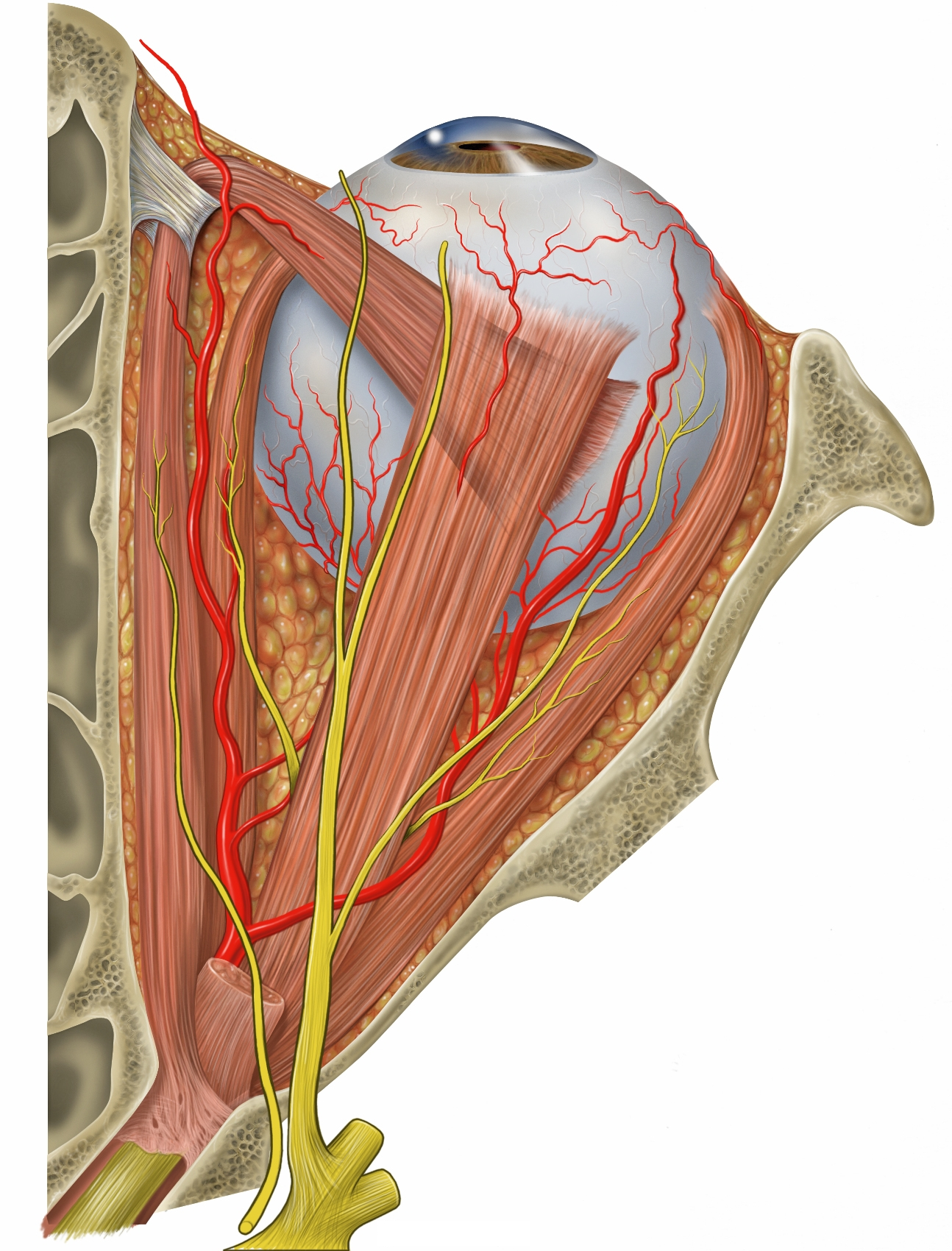
The superior rectus muscle is shown in this image of the right eye from above. Hover the mouse over the structures for their names.

== Structure ==
The superior rectus muscle originates from the annulus of Zinn. It inserts into the anterosuperior surface of the eye. This insertion has a width of around 11 mm. It is around 7.7 mm from the corneal limbus.

=== Nerve supply ===
The superior rectus muscle is supplied by the superior division of the ipsilateral oculomotor nerve (III). Each superior rectus muscle is innervated by contralateral oculomotor nucleus in the mesencephalon.

=== Relations ===
The superior rectus muscle is related to the other extraocular muscles, particularly to the medial rectus muscle and the lateral rectus muscle. The insertion of the superior rectus muscle is around 7.5 mm from the insertion of the medial rectus muscle, around 7.1 mm from the insertion of the lateral rectus muscle, and around 7.9 from the corneal limbus. There is an intermuscular septum between it and the lateral rectus muscle.

=== Variation ===
Variations of the superior rectus muscle is rare. It may rarely have two muscle bellies parallel to each other. More rarely, it may be congenitally absent.

== Function ==
The superior rectus muscle elevates, adducts, and helps intort (rotate the superior pole of the eye medially) the eye.

== Clinical significance ==
=== Testing ===
The superior rectus muscle is the only muscle that is capable of elevating the eye when it is in a fully abducted position.

=== Exophthalmos ===
Much of the venous drainage of the orbit and the extraocular muscles passes close to the superior rectus muscle. Obstruction to this venous drainage can cause venous congestion in the eye, which may cause exophthalmos (bulging eye ball). This may be shown with CT scans.

=== Weakness and paralysis ===
The superior rectus muscle may be weakened or paralysed by problems with nerve conduction of the oculomotor nerve (III). This may be congenital, often with a familial genetic link, or acquired, most often caused by head injuries.

=== Overreaction ===
Local anaesthetics used in cataract surgery may weaken the inferior rectus muscle, despite efforts to use minimal anaesthetic and to avoid placing the needle into the muscle. Weakness of the inferior rectus muscle may strengthen the superior rectus muscle, causing it to be overreactive. This may elevate the eye, and prevent its use in normal vision. Treatment may involve eye surgery that weakens or repositions the superior rectus muscle, which generally has good outcomes.

=== Absence ===
Very rarely, the superior rectus muscle may be congenitally absent. This may be caused by Apert syndrome. This causes a reduced ability to elevate the eye. It may be treated with eye surgery that uses parts of the medial rectus muscle and the lateral rectus muscle to restore the functions normally performed by the superior rectus muscle.

== Additional images ==
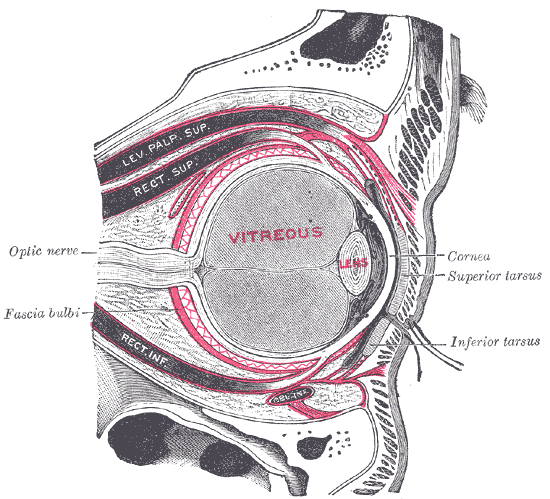
The right eye in sagittal section, showing the fascia bulbi (semidiagrammatic).

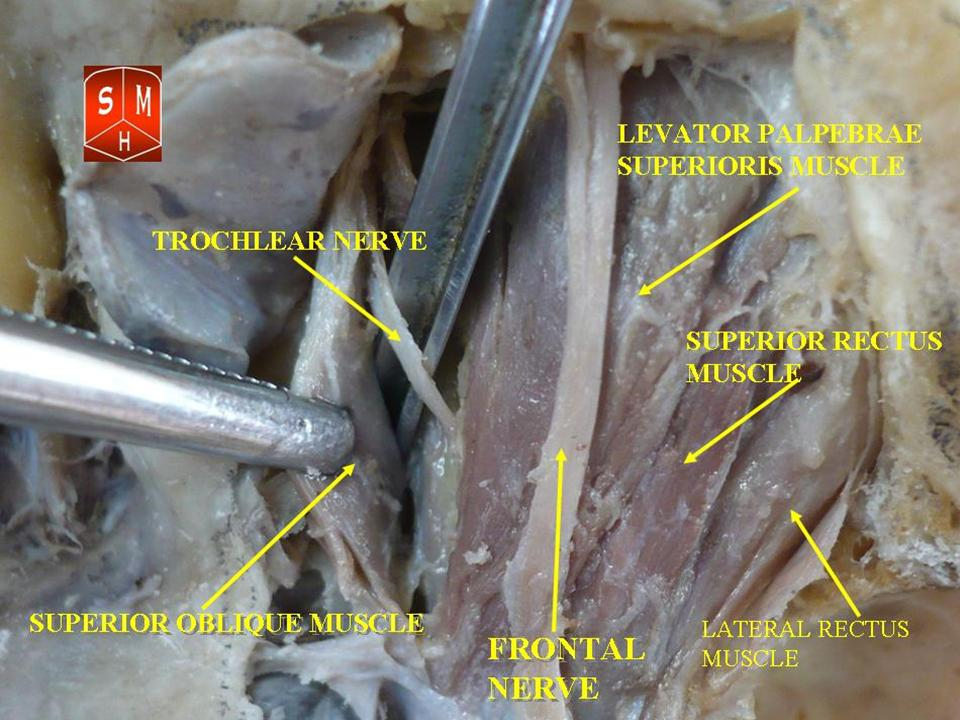
Superior rectus muscle

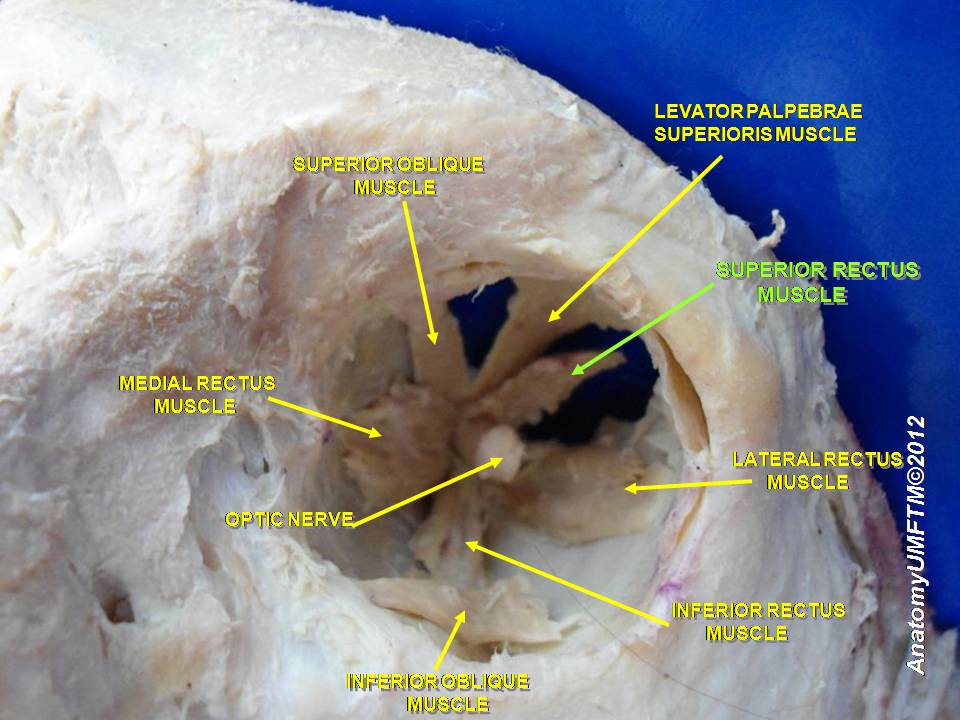
Superior rectus muscle

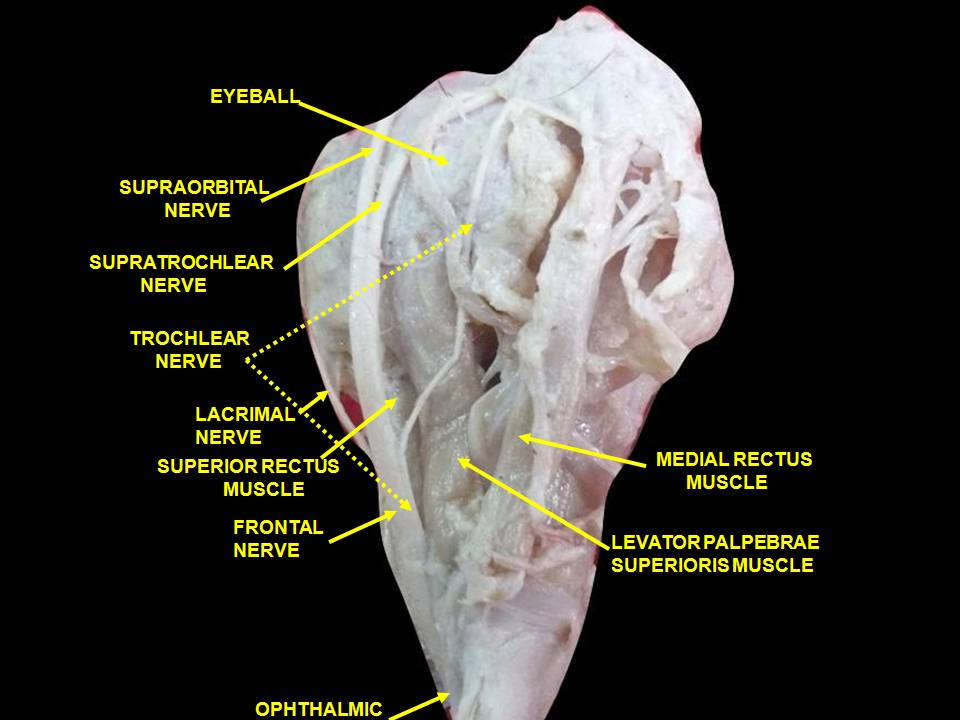
Extrinsic eye muscle. Nerves of orbita. Deep dissection.

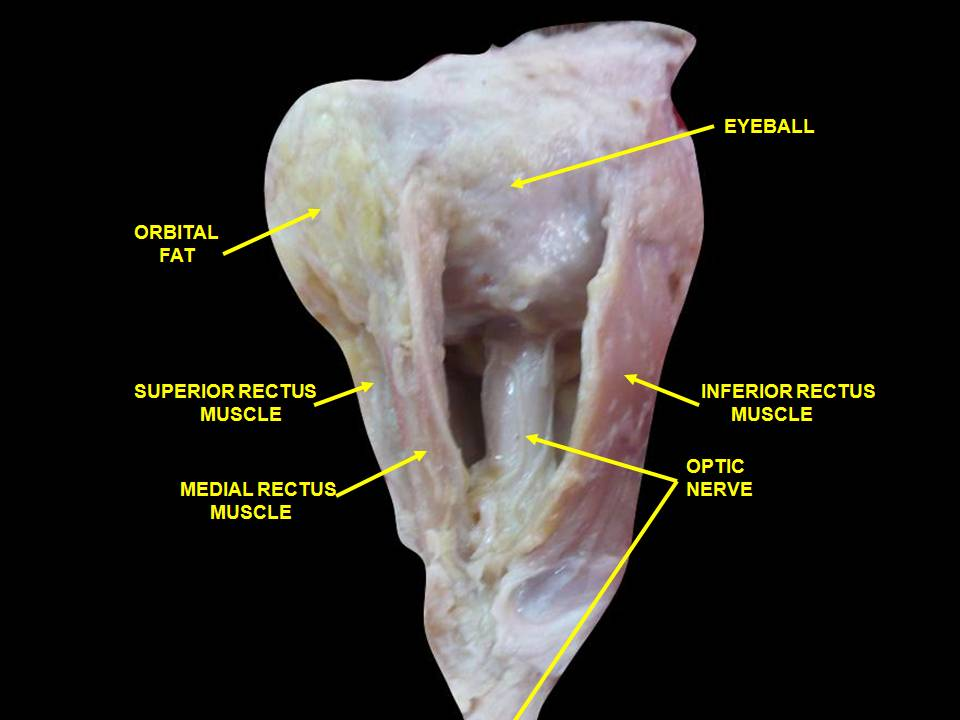
Extrinsic eye muscle. Nerves of orbita. Deep dissection.

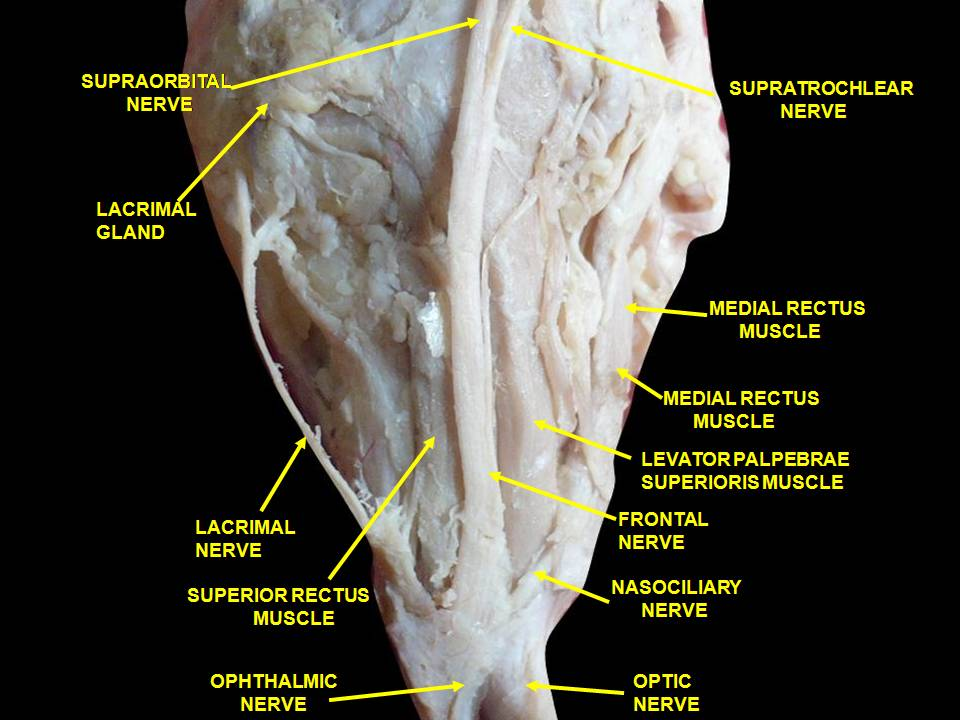
Extrinsic eye muscle. Nerves of orbita. Deep dissection.

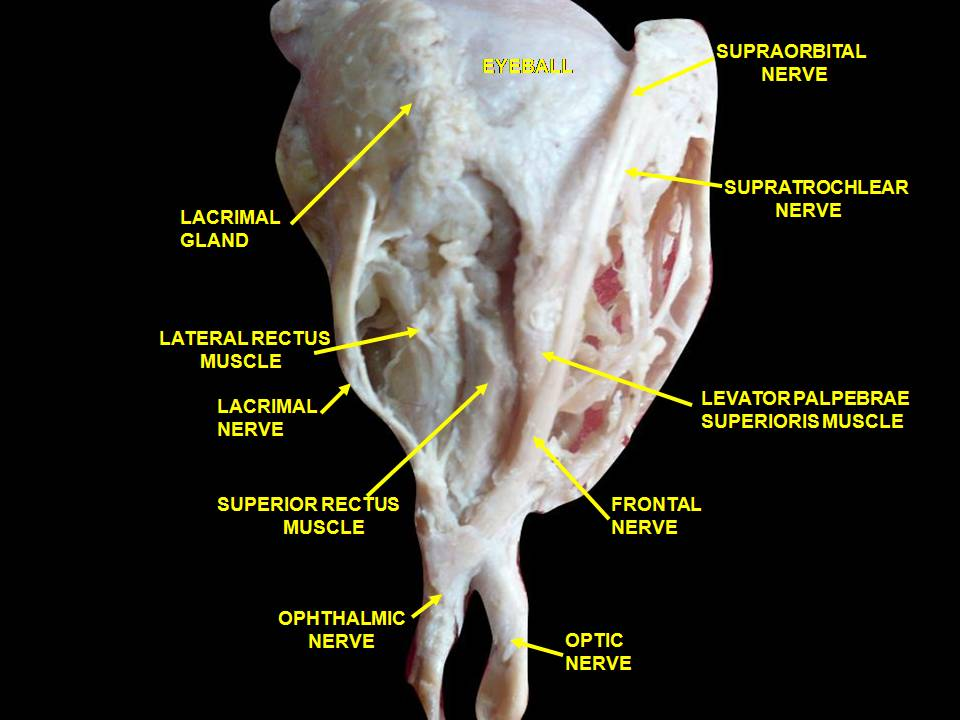
Extrinsic eye muscle. Nerves of orbita. Deep dissection.

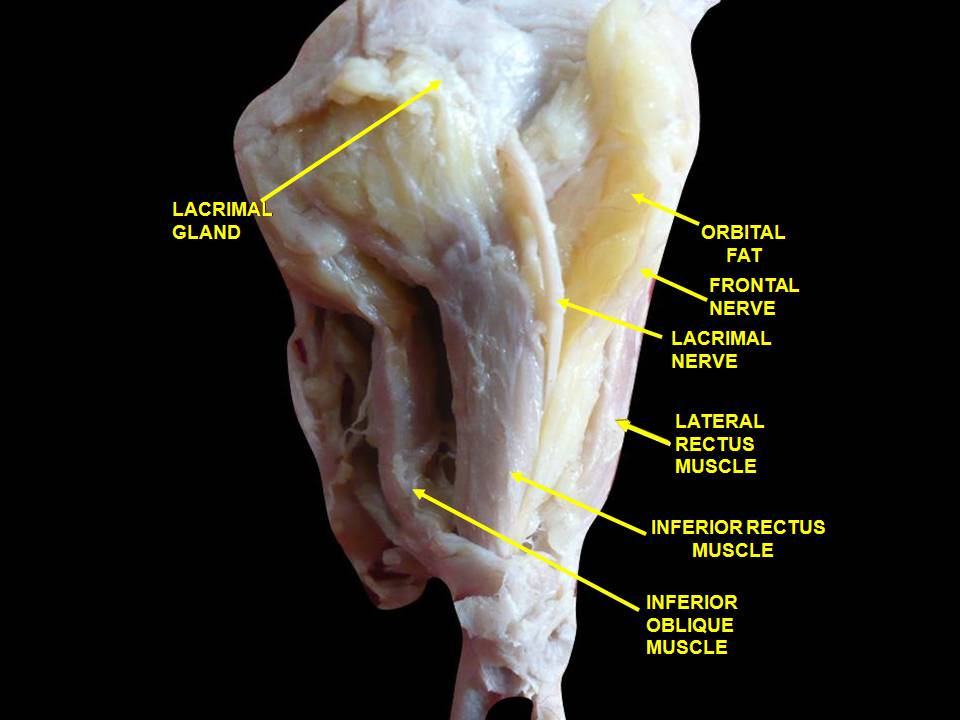
Extrinsic eye muscle. Nerves of orbita. Deep dissection.
