= Inferior rectus muscle =

Muscle of the eye

Inferior rectus
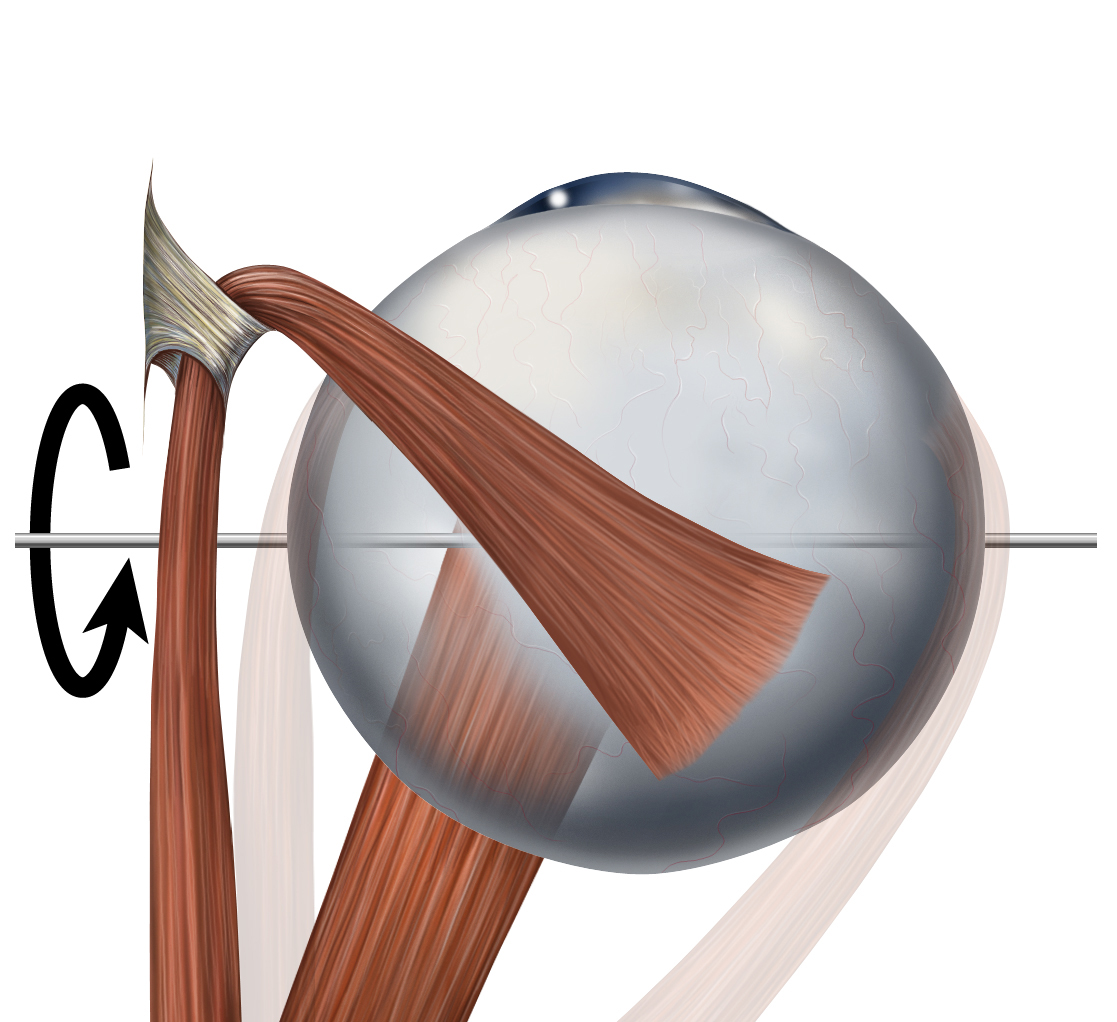
- The inferior rectus muscle, is shown in this superior view of the eye, along with its axis of rotation. The other muscle is the superior oblique muscle, which angles around the trochlea.

Details
- Origin: Common tendinous ring at the orbital apex
- Insertion: 6.8 mm inferior to the corneal limbus
- Artery: Inferior muscular branch of the ophthalmic artery, infraorbital artery
- Vein: Inferior muscular branch of the ophthalmic vein
- Nerve: Inferior branch of oculomotor nerve
- Actions: Depression, adduction, extorsion

Identifiers
- Latin: musculus rectus inferior bulbi
- TA98: A15.2.07.011
- TA2: 2043
- FMA: 49036

The inferior rectus muscle is a muscle in the orbit near the eye. It is one of the four recti muscles in the group of extraocular muscles. It originates from the common tendinous ring, and inserts into the anteroinferior surface of the eye. It depresses the eye (downwards).

== Structure ==
The inferior rectus muscle originates from the common tendinous ring (annulus of Zinn). It inserts into the anteroinferior surface of the eye. This insertion has a width of around 10.5 mm. It is around 6.6 mm from the corneal limbus.

=== Blood supply ===
The inferior rectus muscle is supplied by an inferior muscular branch of the ophthalmic artery. It may also be supplied by a branch of the infraorbital artery. It is drained by the corresponding veins: the inferior muscular branch of the ophthalmic vein, and sometimes a branch of the infraorbital vein.

=== Nerve supply ===
The inferior rectus muscle is supplied by the inferior division of the oculomotor nerve (III).

=== Development ===
The inferior rectus muscle develops from the embryonic mesoderm in the orbit of the skull. This is similar to the other extraocular muscles.

=== Relations ===
The insertion of the inferior rectus muscle is around 6 mm from the insertion of the medial rectus muscle, and around 8 mm from the insertion of the lateral rectus muscle. A parasympathetic branch that supplies the ciliary muscles of the pupil passes close to the inferior rectus muscle.

=== Variation ===
Very rarely, the inferior rectus muscle may be congenitally absent. This may cause inferior rectus palsy, where the eye cannot be depressed.

== Function ==
The inferior rectus muscle depresses, adducts, and helps extort the eye. It is the only muscle that is capable of depressing the pupil when it is in a fully abducted position.

== Clinical significance ==
=== Strabismus ===
If the inferior rectus muscle is damaged, weak, or paralysed, this can cause strabismus. This can lead to elevation of the eye, as the superior rectus muscle remains stronger. For minor cases, prism glasses can be used to gradually realign the eye. Alternatively for serious cases, it may be surgically corrected by slightly weakening the superior rectus muscle (opposite)—this reduces the elevation of the eye, and corrects the strabismus. This procedure may lead to overcorrection of the strabismus, but is otherwise generally successful.

=== Surgery ===
Any surgery on the inferior rectus muscle may damage the parasympathetic branches to the ciliary muscles of the pupil. This may cause problems with control of the pupil. Nearby blood vessels and nerves may also be damaged.

== Additional images ==
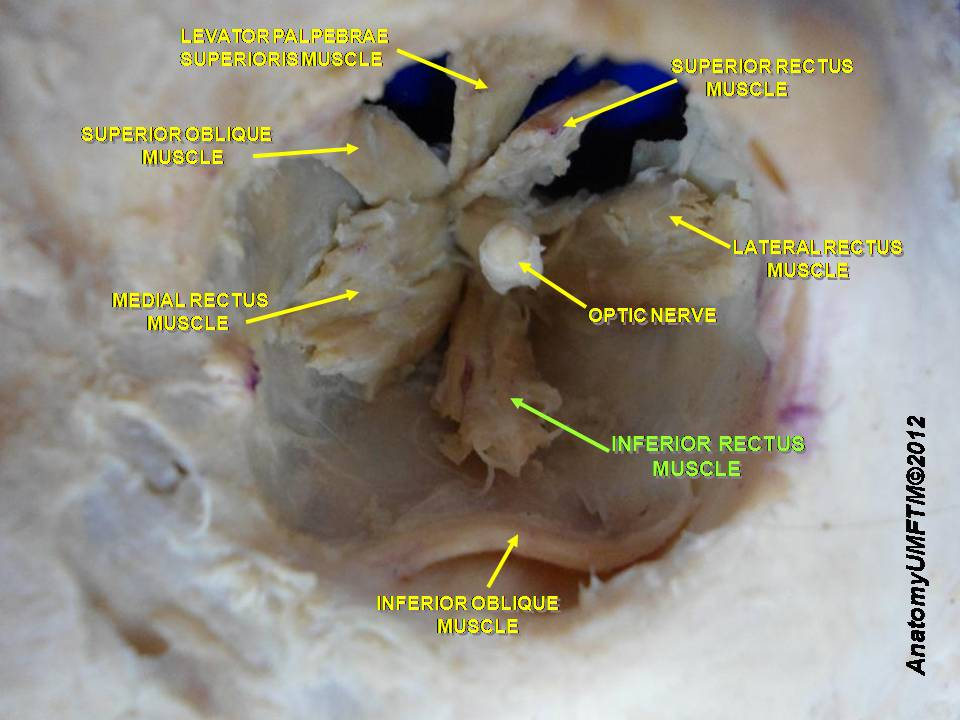
Inferior rectus muscle

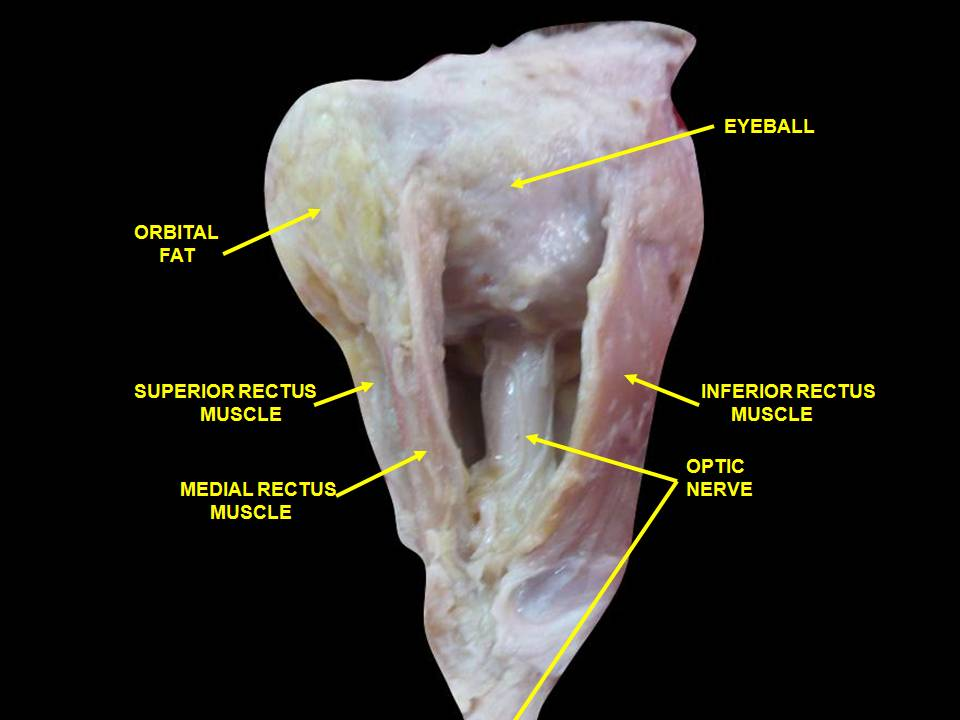
Extrinsic eye muscle. Nerves of orbita. Deep dissection.
