= Lateral rectus muscle =

Muscle on lateral side of the eye

Lateral rectus
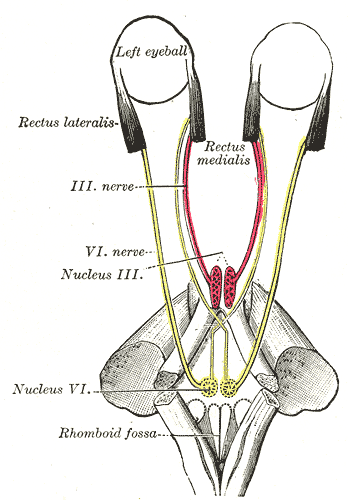
- Figure showing the mode of innervation of the Recti medialis and lateralis of the eye.

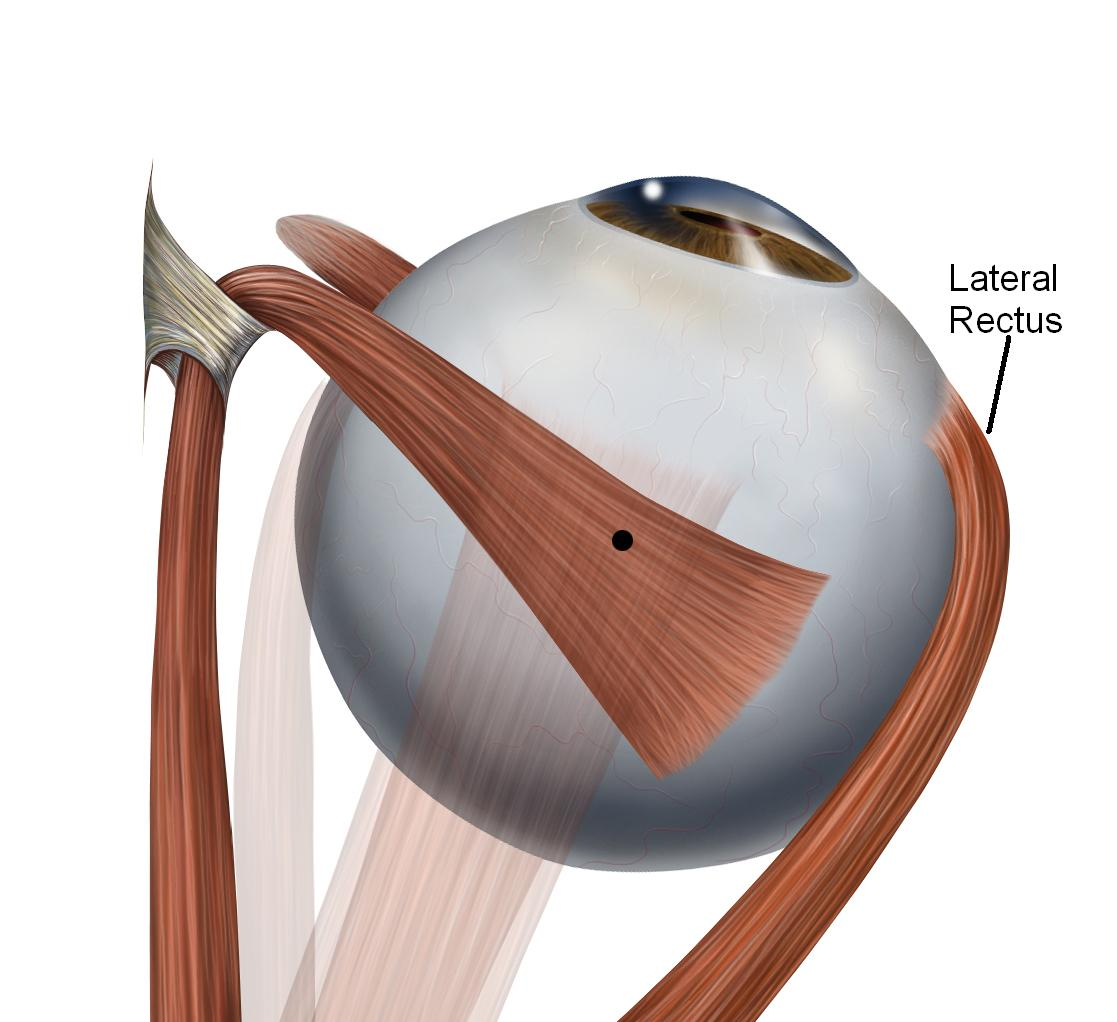
- Lateral rectus muscle: is shown in this superior view of the eye. The lateral rectus is on the right side of the image.

Details
- Origin: Common tendinous ring at the orbital apex
- Insertion: 7 mm temporal to the limbus
- Nerve: Abducens nerve
- Actions: Abducts the eyeball (makes it move outwards)

Identifiers
- Latin: musculus rectus lateralis bulbi
- TA98: A15.2.07.013
- TA2: 2045
- FMA: 49038

The lateral rectus muscle is a muscle on the lateral side of the eye in the orbit. It is one of six extraocular muscles that control the movements of the eye. The lateral rectus muscle is responsible for lateral movement of the eyeball, specifically abduction. Abduction describes the movement of the eye away from the midline (i.a. nose), allowing the eyeball to move horizontally in the lateral direction, bringing the pupil away from the midline of the body.

== Structure ==
The lateral rectus muscle originates at the lateral part of the common tendinous ring, also known as the annular tendon. The common tendinous ring is a tendinous ring that surrounds the optic nerve and serves as the origin for five of the seven extraocular muscles, excluding the inferior oblique muscle.

The lateral rectus muscle inserts into the temporal side of the eyeball. This insertion is 6.9 mm from the corneal limbus. It has a width of around 10 mm.

=== Nerve supply ===
The lateral rectus is the only muscle supplied by the abducens nerve (CN VI). The neuron cell bodies are located in the abducens nucleus in the pons. These neurons project axons as the abducens nerve which exit from the pontomedullary junction of the brainstem, travel through the cavernous sinus and enter the orbit through the superior orbital fissure. It then enters the medial surface of the lateral rectus to innervate it.

=== Relations ===
The insertion of the lateral rectus muscle is around 8 mm from the insertion of the inferior rectus muscle, around 7 mm from the insertion of the superior rectus muscle, and around 10 mm from the corneal limbus.

== Function ==
The lateral rectus muscle abducts the eye, turning the eye laterally in the orbit.

== Clinical significance ==
A sixth nerve palsy, also known as abducens nerve palsy, is a neurological defect that results from a damaged or impaired abducens nerve. This damage can stem from stroke, trauma, tumor, inflammation, and infection. Damage to the abducens nerve by trauma can be caused by any type of trauma that causes elevated intracranial pressure; including hydrocephalus, traumatic brain injury with intracranial bleeding, tumors, and lesions along the nerve at any point between the pons and lateral rectus muscle in orbit. This defect can result in horizontal double vision and reduced lateral movement. The lateral rectus muscle will be denervated and paralyzed and the patient will be unable to abduct the eye. For example, if the left abducens nerve is damaged, the left eye will not abduct fully. While attempting to look straight ahead, the left eye will be deviated medially towards the nose due to the unopposed action of the medial rectus of the eye. Proper function of the lateral rectus is tested clinically by asking the patient to look laterally. Depending on the underlying cause of the lateral rectus palsy, some improvement may occur naturally over time. While the prognosis for a lateral rectus palsy onset by a viral illness is generally positive, the prognosis for an onset of trauma or tumor is quite poor. Ultimately, nerves are not very good at regenerating or healing themselves, so if the damage is severe there will be permanent damage.

In addition, another disorder associated with the lateral rectus muscle is Duane Syndrome. This syndrome occurs when the sixth cranial nerve which controls the lateral rectus muscle does not develop properly. It is believed that Duane Syndrome is a result of a disturbance of normal embryonic development due to a genetic or an environmental factor.

== Additional images ==
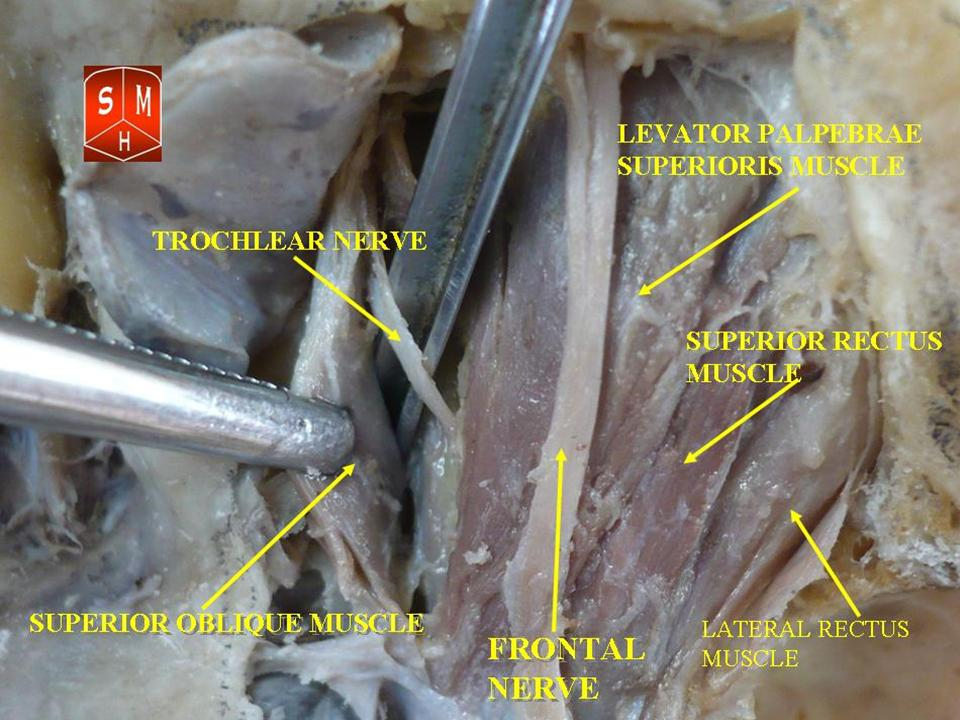
Lateral rectus muscle

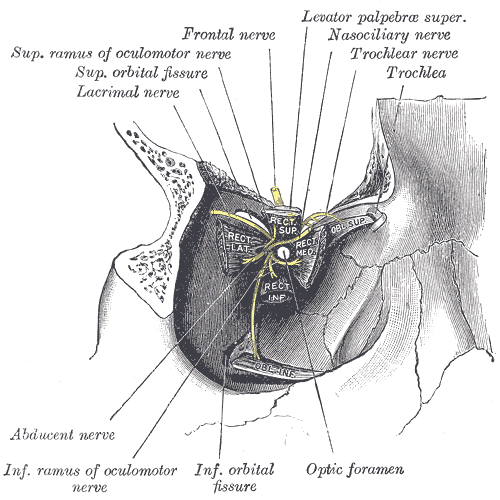
Dissection showing origins of right ocular muscles, and nerves entering by the superior orbital fissure.

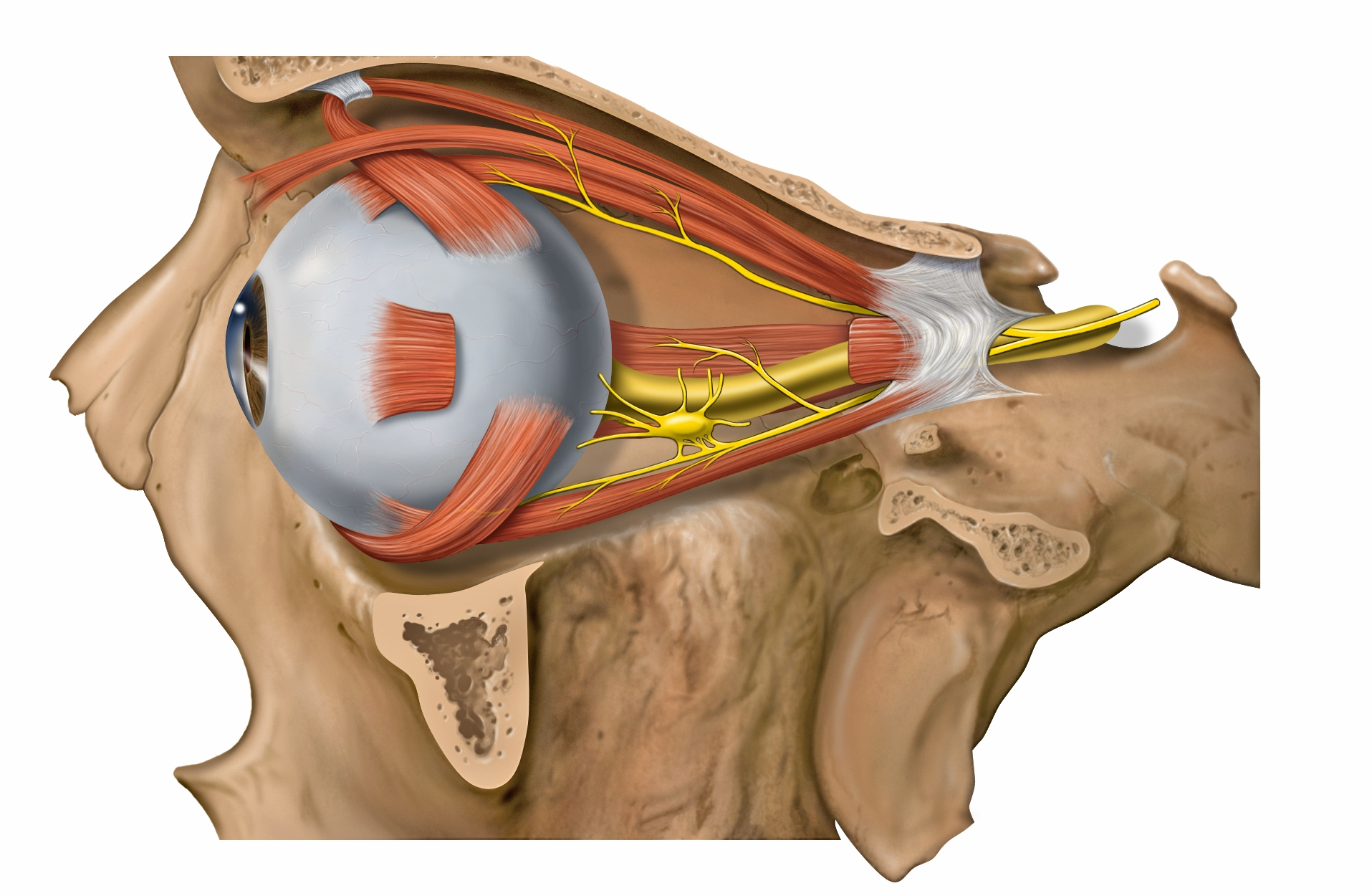
Lateral view of the eyeball with lateral rectus muscle visible (cut).

== See also ==
- Extraocular muscles
