= Facial symmetry =

One specific measure of bodily symmetry

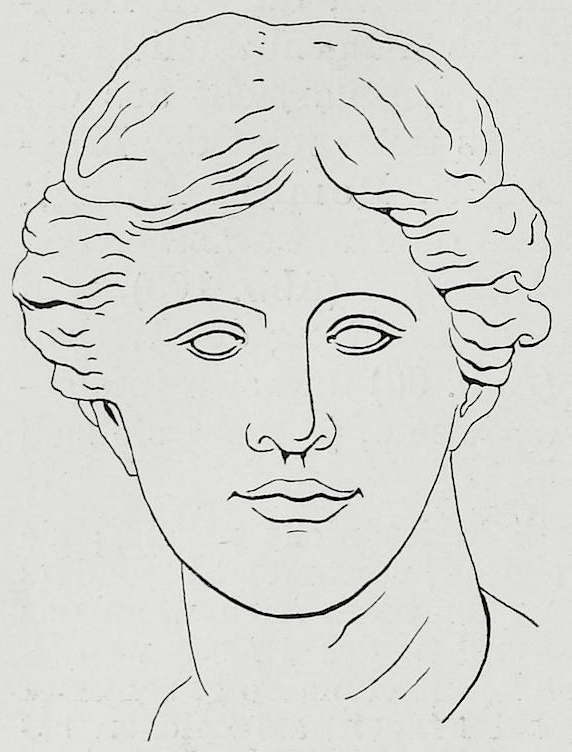
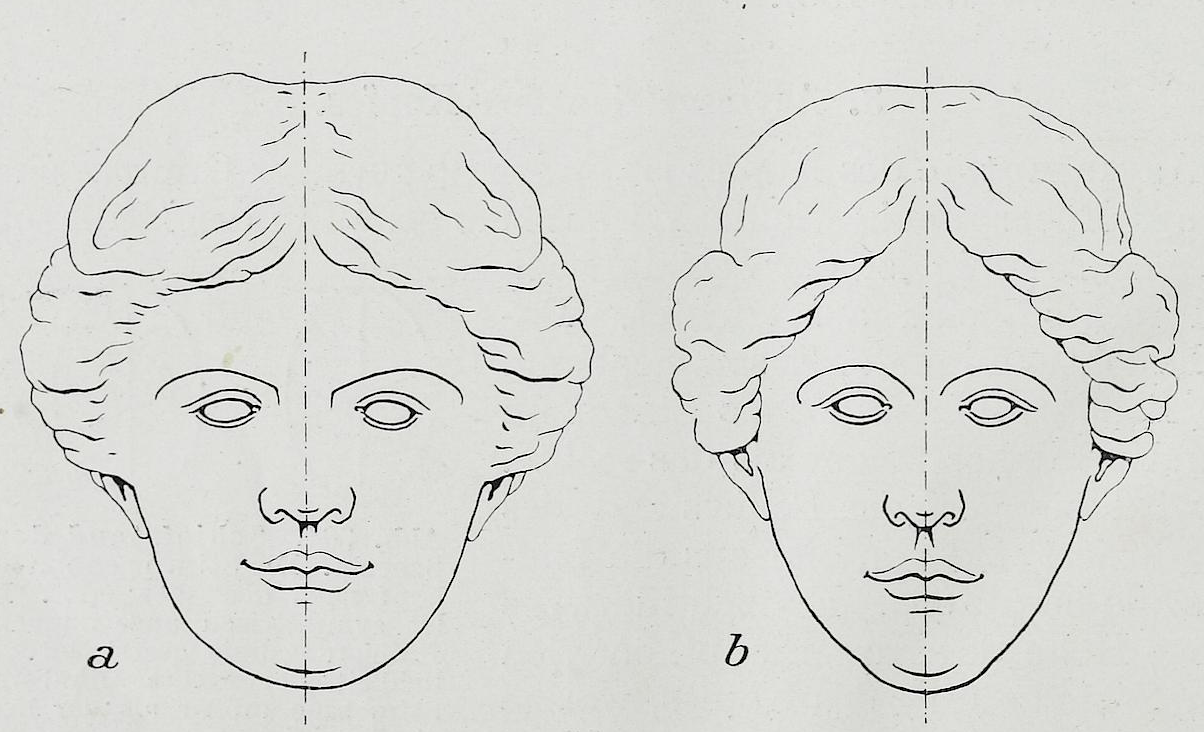
While symmetrical faces (leftmost image) are perceived to be attractive, completely symmetric faces (a and b) are disconcerting and are not perceived as normal.

Facial symmetry is one specific measure of bodily symmetry. Along with traits such as averageness and youthfulness, it influences judgments of aesthetic traits of physical attractiveness and beauty. For instance, in mate selection, people have been shown to have a preference for symmetry.

Facial bilateral symmetry is typically defined as fluctuating asymmetry of the face comparing random differences in facial features of the two sides of the face. The human face also has systematic, directional asymmetry: on average, the face (mouth, nose and eyes) sits systematically to the left with respect to the axis through the ears, the so-called aurofacial asymmetry.

== Directional asymmetry ==
Directional asymmetry is systematic. The average across the population is not "symmetric", but statistically significantly biased on one direction. That means, that individuals of a species can be symmetric, or even asymmetric to the opposite side (see, e.g., handedness), but most individuals are asymmetric to the same side. The relation between directional and fluctuating asymmetry is comparable to the concepts of accuracy and precision in empirical measurements.

There are examples from the brain (Yakovlevian torque) and spine, and inner organs (see axial twist theory), but also from various animals (see Symmetry in biology).

=== Aurofacial asymmetry ===
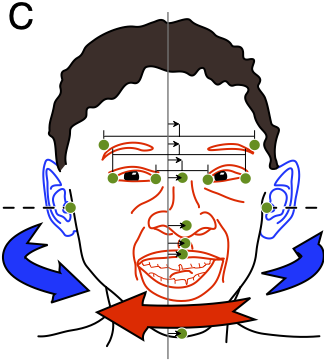
Exaggerated schema of the aurofacial asymmetry as predicted by the axial twist theory. During embryology and development, the face elements (red) are predicted to move toward the center from the left, with respect to the mid-plane between the ears.

Aurofacial asymmetry (from Latin auris 'ear' and facies 'face') is an example of directed asymmetry of the face. It refers to the left-sided offset of the face (i.e. eyes, nose, and mouth) with respect to the ears. On average, the face's offset is slightly to the left, meaning that the right side of the face appears larger than the left side. The offset is larger in newborns and reduces gradually during growth.

==== Anatomy and definition ====
In contrast to fluctuating asymmetry, directional asymmetry is systematic, i.e. across the population it is systematically more often in one direction than in the other. It means that across the population a deviation is more often to one direction than to the other, i.e., there is a statistically significant bias to one direction. In case of directional asymmetry, most individuals of a species are asymmetric to the same side, even though some individuals can be symmetric, or even asymmetric to the opposite side (cf., e.g., handedness). The relation between directional and fluctuating asymmetry is comparable to the concepts of accuracy and precision in empirical measurements.

The aurofacial asymmetry is defined as the position of the face (mouth, nose and eyes) with respect to the mid plane of the axis through the ears. The asymmetry is expressed as an angle (degrees), i.e. by how many degrees certain facial landmarks (e.g. tip of the nose) or pairs of landmarks (e.g. inner corners of the eyes) are rotated away from the mid plane between the ears.

==== Magnitude across the face and development ====
Average aurofacial asymmetry in 200 adults. A. Red-shaded: significant asymmetry towards the left ear. B. The amount of asymmetry at the level of each arrow in panel A. Source: figure 2 of Lussanet & Osse (2012), data from Blanz & Vetter (1999).

On average, the aurofacial asymmetry is slightly larger for the eyes than for the nose, as shown by the figure.

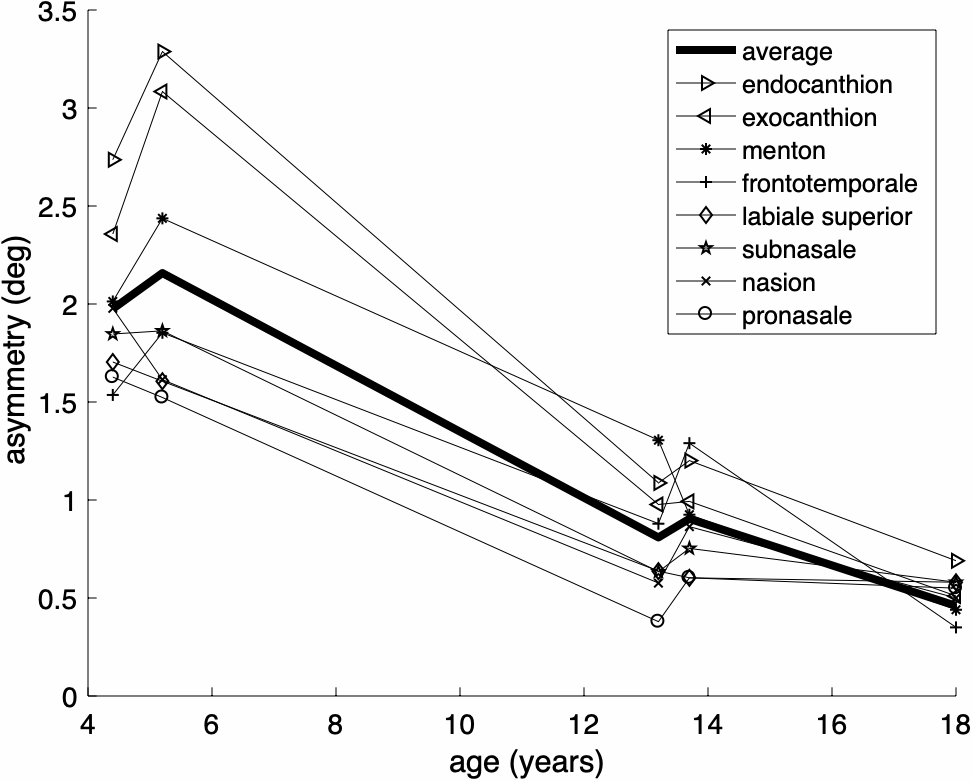
The gradual decrease of the aurofacial asymmetry with age until the beginning of adulthood. Source: figure 3 of Lussanet & Osse (2012), data from Klingenberg et al. (2010).

In humans asymmetric growth leads to a gradual reduction of the aurofacial asymmetry. As shown in the graph, the asymmetry decreases from about 2° at birth to about 0.5° in adults.

==== Theory and evolution ====
The aurofacial asymmetry was discovered after it was predicted by the axial twist theory. According to the theory the facial asymmetry is related to the Yakovlevian torque of the cerebrum, asymmetric heart and bowels and the spine. It is predicted to be common in vertebrates, but this has never been tested.

The axial twist is said to occur in the early embryo, though this has never been demonstrated. According to the theory, the anterior head region makes a half-turn around the body axis in anti-clockwise direction (looking from tail to head), whereas the rest of the body (except heart and bowels) make a half-turn in clockwise direction. Since the axial twist is located between the ear-region and the forebrain-face-region, it is predicted that the face grows from the left to the midline. Aurofacial asymmetry was statistically proven, and interpreted as a potential source of empirical support for axial twist theory.

== Fluctuating asymmetry ==
Fluctuating asymmetry is the non-systematic variation of individual facial landmarks with respect to the facial midline, i.e., the line perpendicular to the line through the eyes, which crosses the tip of the nose and the chin.

A wide variety of methods have been used to examine the claim that facial symmetry plays a role in judgments of beauty. Blending of multiple faces to create a composite and face-half mirroring have been among the techniques used.

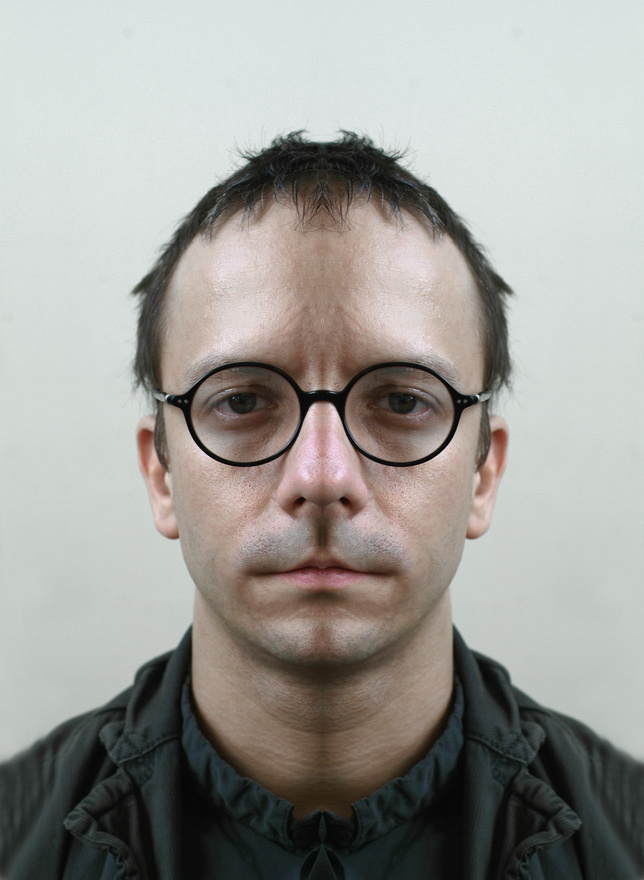
2 right sides

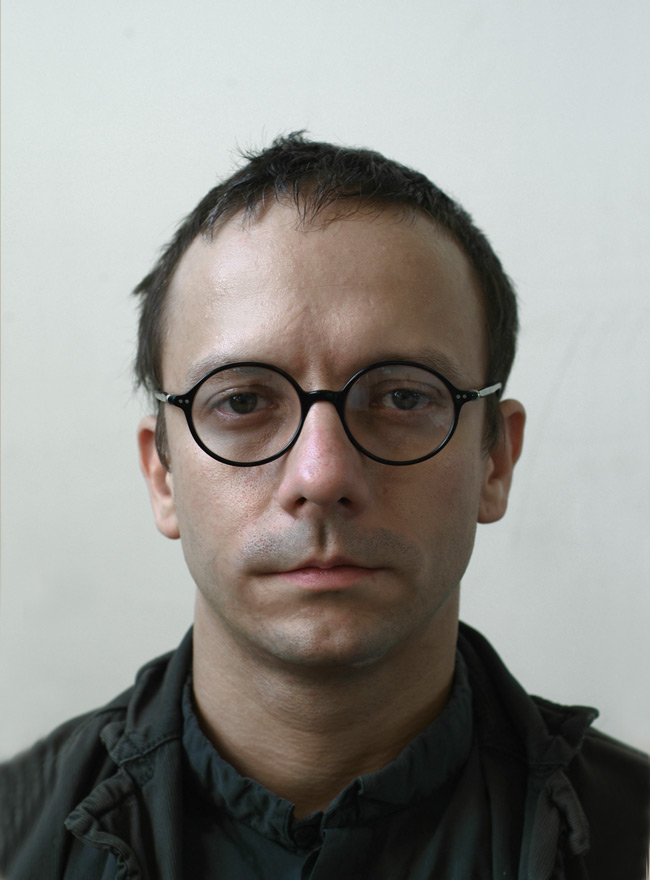
Original

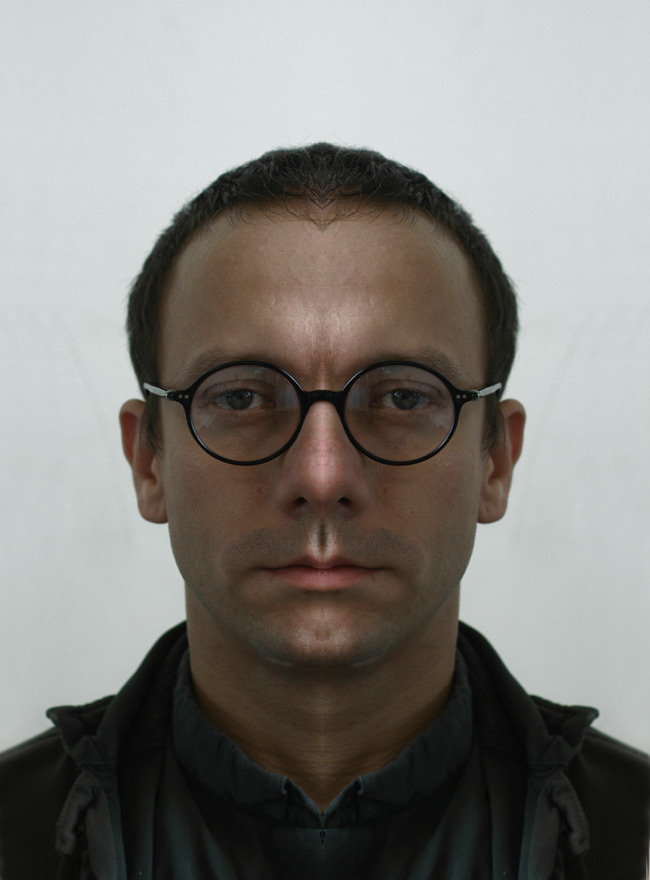
2 left sides

Conclusions derived from face mirroring, however, have been called into question, because it has been shown that mirroring face-halves creates artificial features. For example, if the nose of an individual is slightly bent to the right side, then mirroring the right side of the face will lead to an over-sized nose, while mirroring the left side will lead to an unnaturally small nose.

=== Attractiveness ===
Facial symmetry has been found to increase ratings of attractiveness in human faces. More symmetrical faces are perceived as more attractive in both males and females, although facial symmetry plays a larger role in judgments of attractiveness concerning female faces. Studies have shown that nearly symmetrical faces are considered highly attractive as compared to asymmetrical ones.

=== Dynamic asymmetries ===
Highly conspicuous directional asymmetries can be temporary ones. For example, during speech, most people (76%) tend to express greater amplitude of movement on the right side of their mouth. This is most likely caused by the uneven strengths of contralateral neural connections between the left hemisphere of the brain (linguistic localization) and the right side of the face.

=== Facial averageness vs. symmetry ===
Experiments suggest that symmetry and averageness make independent contributions to attractiveness.

=== Aging ===
Facial symmetry is also a valid marker of cognitive aging. Progressive changes occurring throughout life in the soft tissues of the face will cause more prominent facial asymmetry in older faces. Therefore, symmetrical transformation of older faces generally increases their attractiveness while symmetrical transformation in young adults and children will decrease their attractiveness.

== Physiognomy ==
Physiognomy or face reading is the practice of assessing a person's character or personality from their outer appearance—especially the face. Physiognomy as a practice meets the contemporary definition of pseudoscience and is regarded as such by academics because of its unsupported claims. Nevertheless, the subject is topic of serious scientific research. Statistical correlations does not inform about possible causal dependence, so if observers judge the personality of (pictures of) symmetric faces differently than asymmetric ones, this might be due to cultural prejudice.

Research indicates that a correlation exists between facial symmetry and the 'big-five' model of personality. The five factors are:

- Openness to experience (inventive/curious vs. consistent/cautious)
- Conscientiousness (efficient/organized vs. easy-going/careless)
- Extraversion (outgoing/energetic vs. solitary/reserved)
- Agreeableness (friendly/compassionate vs. challenging/detached)
- Neuroticism (sensitive/nervous vs. secure/confident)

Accordingly, a positive correlation was found between facial symmetry and extraversion, as judged by others from photographs, as well as by the subjects themselves. More symmetrical faces are also judged to be lower on neuroticism but higher on conscientiousness and agreeableness (asymmetrical faces were rated as less agreeable than normal ones, but the more symmetrical were again rated as somewhat less agreeable than the normal). More symmetrical faces are also more likely to have more desirable social attributes assigned to them, such as sociable, intelligent or lively.

The correlation of facial symmetry and neuroticism, openness, agreeableness and conscientiousness has remained unclear. Openness and agreeableness appear to be significantly negatively correlated to facial symmetry, while neuroticism and conscientiousness do not seem to be correlated to facial symmetry. With respect to trustworthiness it has been found that the facial muscles become imbalanced when lying.

== Evolution and sexual selection ==
Sexual selection is a theoretical construct within evolution theory. According to sexual selection, mate choice can have profound influence on the preferred features. Sexual selection can only influence features that potential mates can perceive, such as smell, audition (e.g. song) and vision. Such features might be reliable indicators of hidden fitness parameters such as a good immune system or developmental stability.

It has been argued that more symmetric faces are preferred because symmetry might be a reliable sign of such hidden fitness parameters. However it is possible that high facial symmetry in an individual is not due to their superior genetics but due to a lack of exposure to stressors, such as alcohol, during prenatal development.

It has been found that more symmetrical faces are rated as healthier than less symmetrical faces. Indeed, facial symmetry was found to be positively associated with the perceived healthiness of the facial skin. Also, facial asymmetry was found to be correlated with physiological, psychological and emotional distress.

Some evidence suggests that face preferences in adults might be correlated to infections in childhood.

== See also ==
- Beauty
- Symmetry in nature
- Patterns in nature
- Physical attractiveness
- Beauty Influencers
