= Contralateral brain =

Each side of the forebrain represents the opposite side of the body

Contralateral brain

The contralateral organization of the forebrain (Latin: contra‚ against; latus‚ side; lateral‚ sided) is the property that the hemispheres of the cerebrum and the thalamus represent mainly the contralateral side of the body. Consequently, the left side of the forebrain mostly represents the right side of the body, and the right side of the brain primarily represents the left side of the body. The contralateral organization involves both executive and sensory functions (e.g., a left-sided brain lesion may cause a right-sided hemiplegia). The contralateral organization is only present in vertebrates.

A number of theories have been put forward to explain this phenomenon, but none are generally accepted. These include, among others, Cajal's visual map theory, different topological approaches, the somatic twist theory and the axial twist theory.

== Anatomy ==
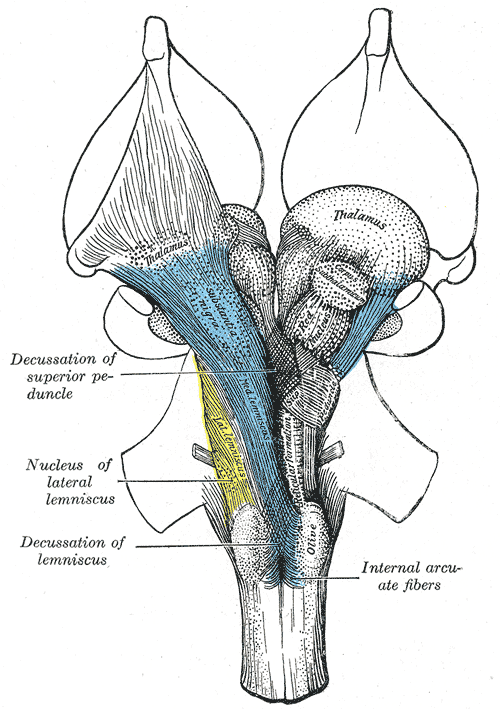
Some afferent decussations.

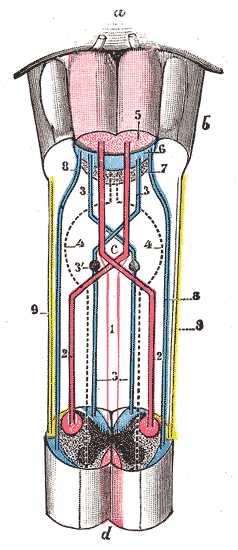
Pyramidal decussations.

Anatomically, the contralateral organization is manifested by major decussations (based on the Latin notation for ten, 'deca,' as an uppercase 'X') and chiasmas (after the Greek uppercase letter 'Χ,' chi). A decussation denotes a crossing of bundles of axonal fibres inside the central nervous system. Due to decussations the efferent connections of the cerebrum to the basal ganglia, the cerebellum and the spine are crossed; and the afferent connections from the spine, the cerebellum and the pons to the thalamus are crossed. Thus, motor, somatosensory, auditory, and visual primary regions in the forebrain predominantly represent the contralateral side of the body.

Two of the cranial nerves show chiasmas: (1) the chiasma of the optic tract (i.e., cranial nerve II), which originates from the eyes and inserts on the optic tectum of the midbrain; and (2) the trochlear nerve (i.e., cranial nerve IV), which originates in the ventral midbrain and innervates one of the six muscles that rotate the eye (i.e., the superior oblique muscle). The oculomotor nerve (cranial nerve III) crosses the midline before leaving the central nervous system (i.e. it decussates rather than chiasmates).

=== The contralateral organization is incomplete ===
Although the forebrain of all vertebrates shows a contralateral organization, this contralaterality is by no means complete. Some of these exceptions are worth mentioning:

- Olfaction (i.e., smelling sense) is a noteworthy exception. Each olfactory lobe connects to the ipsilateral (same-side) centers of the frontal cerebrum.
- In chondrichthyans (e.g., sharks and skates), the thalamus does not retrieve a branch from the optic tract but only from the contralateral optic tectum, so that the optic path decussates twice, and the forebrain represents the ipsilateral (same-side) eye.
- In large brains (e.g., humans, elephants and whales), some functions tend to be strongly lateralized. For example, the language regions (i.e., Broca's and Wernicke's area) are situated in the left hemisphere of most humans.
- Most afferent and efferent connections of the forebrain have bilateral components, especially outside the primary sensory and motor regions. As a result, a hemiplegia that is acquired at very young age can sometimes be completely compensated over time.

== Theories ==
While the molecular mechanisms for the crossing of axons across the midline are relatively well understood, there is no generally accepted evolutionary theory to explain the contralateral organization of the brain. Most well known are the visual map theory of Ramón y Cajal, the efficient wiring theories, and the twist theories.

=== Visual map theory ===
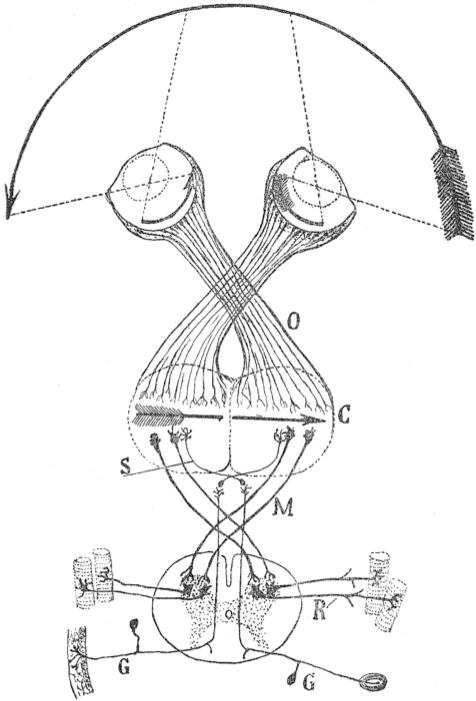
Cajal's schema of the visual map theory. O=Optic chiasm; C=Visual (and motor) cortex; M, S=Decussating pathways; R, G: Sensory nerves, motor ganglia.

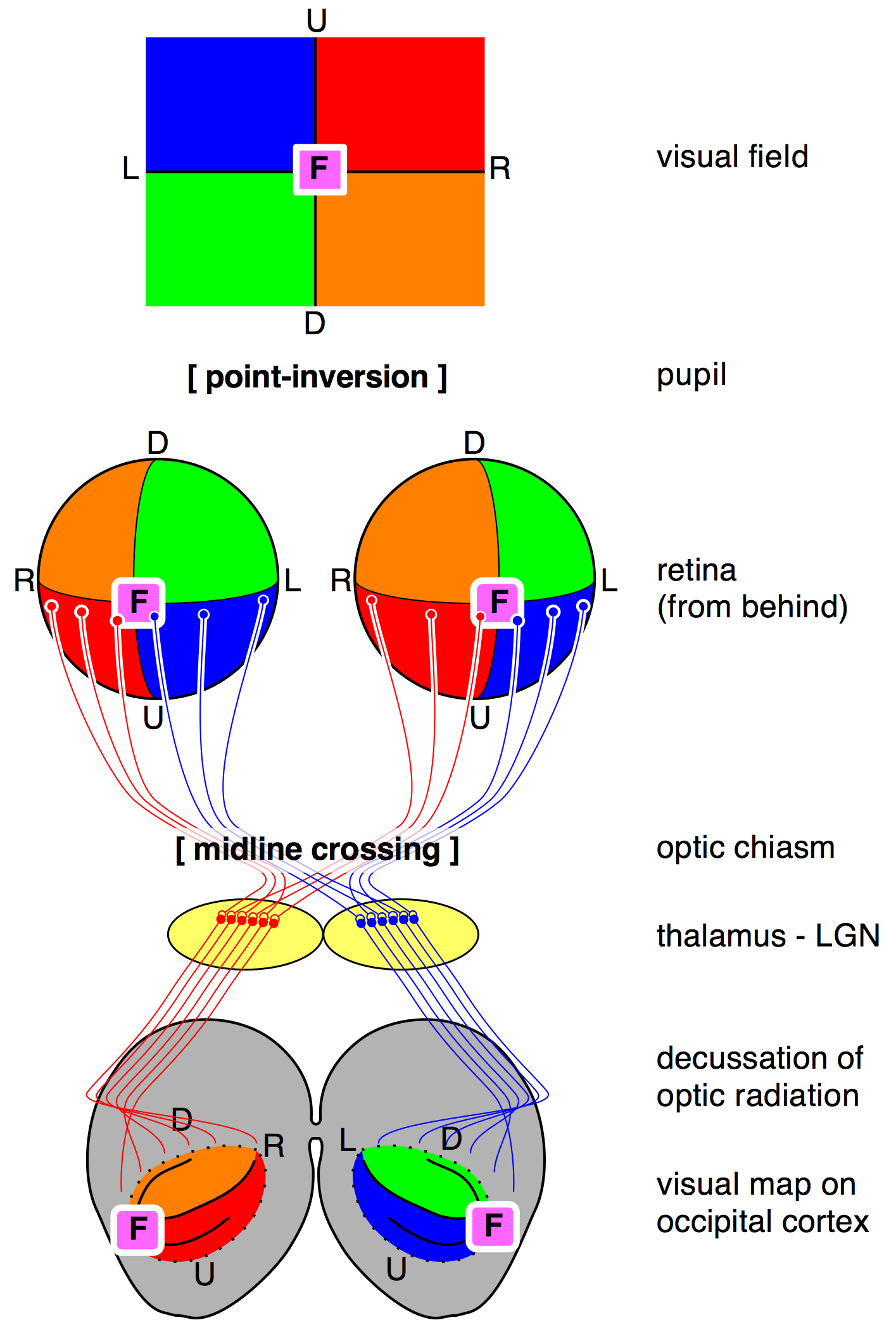
Transformations of the visual field toward the visual map on the primary visual cortex. U=up; D=down; L=left; R=right; F=fovea

The visual map theory was published by the famous neuroscientist and pioneer Santiago Ramón y Cajal (1898). According to this theory, the function of the optic chiasm is to repair the retinal field image on the visual cortex. The pupil in the vertebrates' eyes inverts the image on the retina, so that the visual periphery projects to the medial side of the retina. By the chiasmatic crossing, the visual periphery is again on the outside, if one assumes that the retinal map is faithfully maintained throughout the optic tract.

The theory has a number of weaknesses. For example, the visual tracts spiral their way from the thalamic LGN to the visual cortex. (See figure; this path is known as the optic radiation.) As a result, the retinal map shows the visual periphery on the medial side. However, the central objective of the theory was to obtain a precise, faithful visual map with the medial field projecting to the medial sides of the visual cortex.. Furthermore, in individuals with non-decussating retinal-fugal fiber syndrome, where optic chiasm does not form and retinal connections are entirely ipsilateral, normal visual processing seems to be retained despite the loss of [binocular vision].

=== Axial twist ===
Two twist hypotheses have been proposed independently: the axial twist by de Marc Lussanet and Jan Osse and the somatic twist by Marcel Kinsbourne. Both of them propose that the rostral part of the head, including the forebrain, is in fact effectively completely turned around. As a consequence, the left and right in the brain are reversed, but also anterior (frontal) and posterior (back / occipital). Whereas the somatic twist hypothesis focuses purely on the morphological phenomenon of the inversions of the forebrain, the axial twist theory also addresses the development and the evolution.

==== Axial twist theory ====
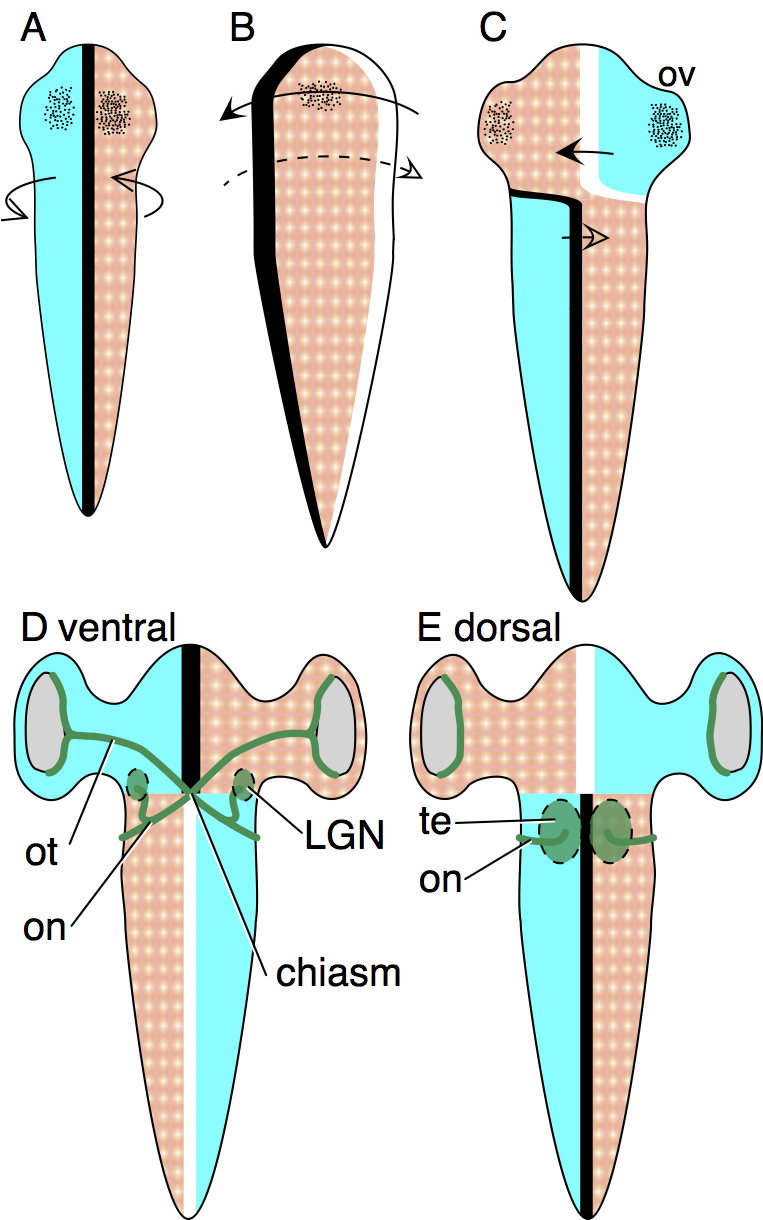
Schema of the developmental twist, according to the axial twist hypothesis. A, B: The early embryo turns onto its left side; B, C: Symmetry is retained by a further left turn in the anterior head region and a compensating right turn in the rest of the body. D, E: Growth of the optic tract leading to the optic chiasma. Colors refer to early embryo: Red=right side, blue=left side, black=dorsal, white=ventral.

The axial twist theory was designed to explain how the pattern of contralateral organization, decussations and chiasmas develops, and why this pattern is so evolutionarily stable, having no known exceptions throughout the 500 million years of vertebrate evolution. According to the theory, the contralateral organization develops as follows: The early embryo is turned onto its left side, such that its left is turned to the yolk and its right is turned away from the yolk. This asymmetric orientation is compensated by asymmetric growth, to regain superficial bilateral symmetry. The anterior head region turns to the left, as shown in the schema. The forebrain is not a superficial structure, but it is so intimately associated with superficial body structures that it turns along with the anterior head. These structures will later form the eyes, nostrils and mouth.

The body behind the head compensates the asymmetric body orientation in the opposite direction, by turning to the right. (See schema.) Due to these oppositely directed compensations of the anterior head and the rest of the body, the animal becomes twisted.

The optic tract grows from the retina to the optic tectum. Because dorsal and ventral are inverted in the anterior head region, the tracts grow at first toward the ventral side, to meet in the midline to form a chiasma. Since the optic tectum lies on the dorsal midbrain, each tract then continues dorsally to the contralateral optic tectum.

The heart and bowels are internal organs with no strong integration in external body structures, so there is no evolutionary pressure to make them turn in a similar way. Rather, these organs retain their original asymmetric orientation in the body.

The axial twist hypothesis predicts that small asymmetries of the face and brain—as well as those found in the opposite direction in the trunk—remain into adulthood.

==== Comparing inversion, somatic twist and axial twist ====
The idea of a somatic twist was inspired by the dorsoventral inversion hypothesis; and was proposed by Marcel Kinsbourne.

According to the dorsoventral inversion hypothesis, an ancestral deuterostome turned on its back. As a result, vertebrates have a dorsal nervous system, whereas protostomes have a ventral one. According to the somatic twist hypothesis, not the entire animal turned on its back but just the somatic part—i.e., everything behind the eyes, mouth and nostrils, including the forebrain.

The somatic twist hypothesis was proposed as an improvement to the inversion hypothesis, and thus has a much wider explanatory power than its predecessor, but is also more complicated. It not only explains the inversion of the body but additionally the contralateral forebrain. It does not explain, however, how the twist might develop in the vertebrate embryo, nor does it address the possible evolution.

The axial twist theory was proposed independently. In addition to providing rationale for the inverted body and the contralateral forebrain, it may explain why the heart and bowels are asymmetric.

The inversion hypothesis has some supporting evidence, but interpretation is varied. The axial twist hypothesis so far has only very indirect evidence in the form of aurofacial symmetry, which requires additional assumptions about the theory including specific attachments between the face and forebrain as well as an evolutionary "error" in relateralization causing the face to be too twisted.

Furthermore, Comer et al. (2019) argued that the axial twist hypothesis assumes that developing axons should be able to distinguish between ipsilateral and contralateral targets. In several non-retinal commissural pathways, however, experimentally preventing midline crossing causes axons to connect to the corresponding mirrored target on the same side, suggesting that crossing is controlled by local interactions at the CNS midline rather than by the location of the final target. These findings do not exclude an ancestral twist, but challenge the claim that displacement of neuronal targets is by itself sufficient to explain the development of decussated pathways.

== Evolution ==
A remarkable property of the contralateral organization is that it is present in every vertebrate. Even the most distant clades—agnathans—possess an optic chiasma, and even the skull impressions of early vertebrates from the Ordovician show the presence of an optic chiasma: this idea was worked out by Kinsbourne. There is molecular evidence for the inversion hypothesis in almost all groups of deuterostomes. It is not known, however, what exactly was the selective pressure that caused the inversion. Twisting and asymmetric development are well known from other deuterostomes—such as Hemichordata, Echinodermata, Cephalochordata and Tunicata. Turning toward the side or upside-down also occurs frequently in these clades (e.g. sea stars which turn their mouth downwards after the larva has briefly settled with the mouth turned up, or the adult lancelet which buries obliquely with its mouth turned up, or many fish which tend to turn around when feeding from the water surface).

== Developmental malformations ==
In holoprosencephaly, the hemispheres of the cerebrum or part of it are not aligned on the left and right side but only on the frontal and occipital sides of the skull, and the head usually remains very small. According to the axial twist hypothesis, this represents an extreme case of Yakovlevian torque, and may occur when the cerebrum does not turn during early embryology.

Cephalopagus or janiceps twins are conjoined twins who are born with two faces, one on either side of the head. These twins have two brains and two spinal cords, but these are located on the left and the right side of the body. According to the axial twist hypothesis, the two nervous systems could not turn due to the complex configuration of the body and therefore remained on either side.

== See also ==
- Brain asymmetry
- Lateralization of brain function
