= Trochleitis =

Medical condition

Trochleitis is inflammation of the superior oblique tendon trochlea apparatus characterized by localized swelling, tenderness, and severe pain. This condition is an uncommon but treatable cause of periorbital pain. The trochlea is a ring-like apparatus of cartilage through which passes the tendon of the superior oblique muscle. It is located in the superior nasal orbit and functions as a pulley for the superior oblique muscle. Inflammation of the trochlear region leads to a painful syndrome with swelling and exquisite point tenderness in the upper medial rim of the orbit. A vicious cycle may ensue such that inflammation causes swelling and fraying of the tendon which then increases the friction of passing through the trochlea which in turn adds to the inflammation. Trochleitis has also been associated with triggering or worsening of migraine attacks in patients with pre-existing migraines (Yanguela, 2002).

== Symptoms and signs ==
Patients with trochleitis typically experience a dull fluctuating aching over the trochlear region developing over a few days. Some may also feel occasional sharp pains punctuating the ache. In patients with migraines, trochleitis may occur simultaneously with headache. Presentation is usually unilateral with palpable swelling over the affected area supranasal to the eye. The trochlear region is extremely tender to touch. Pain is exacerbated by eye movements looking down and inwards, and especially in supraduction (looking up) and looking outwards, which stretches the superior oblique muscle tendon. Notably, there is no restriction of extraocular movements, no diplopia, and often no apparent ocular signs such as proptosis. However, occasionally mild ptosis is found. The absence of generalized signs of orbital involvement is helpful in eliminating other more common causes of periorbital pain.

== Cause ==
The cause of trochleitis is often unknown (idiopathic trochleitis), but it has been known to occur in patients with rheumatological diseases such as systemic lupus erythematosus, rheumatoid arthritis, enteropathic arthropathy, and psoriasis. In his study, Tychsen and his group evaluated trochleitis patients with echography and CT scan to demonstrate swelling and inflammation. Imaging studies showed inflammation of superior oblique tendon/ trochlear pulley. It was unclear whether the inflammation involved the trochlea itself, or the tissues surrounding the trochlea.

== Diagnosis ==
Trochleitis is diagnosed based on three criteria: 1) demonstration of inflammation of superior oblique tendon/ trochlea region, 2) periorbital pain and tenderness to palpation in the area of the sore trochlea, and 3) worsening of pain on attempted vertical eye movement, particularly with adduction of the eye. It is important to identify trochleitis because it is a treatable condition and the patient can benefit much from pain relief. Treatment consists of a single injection of corticosteroids to the affected peritrochlear region.

== Treatment ==
A specific "cocktail" consisting of depomedrol and lidocaine can be injected into the trochlea; immediate relief due to the effects of the local anesthetic indicates successful placement. However, great care must be taken as the injection is in the region of several arteries, veins and nerves. The needle should not be too small (so as not to penetrate tiny structures), the surgeon should draw back on the syringe (to ensure not have pierced a vessel), the lidocaine should not contain epinephrine (which could cause vasospasm), and the pressure of the injection must always be controlled. Only a limited number of injections can be made as they would otherwise lead to muscle atrophy. Diagnosis can be confirmed by response to this treatment; pain and swelling are expected to disappear in 48–72 hours. Some patients experience recurrence of trochleitis.

== History ==
Trochleitis was first identified in 1984 by Tychsen, et al. in a study of thirteen patients with orbital pain and point tenderness over the trochlear region. Previously, the trochleitis syndrome had been included in the broad category of idiopathic orbital inflammation (also called orbital pseudotumor). From the study, Tychsen and his group surmised that trochleitis was a subtype of idiopathic orbital inflammation distinct from the larger category in that it produced little/ no discernible ocular signs (the eye looked normal) and did not cause restricted extraocular movement.
