= Brown's syndrome =

Brown syndrome
- Specialty: Ophthalmology

Brown syndrome is a rare form of strabismus characterized by limited elevation of the affected eye. The disorder may be congenital (existing at or before birth), or acquired. Brown syndrome is caused by a malfunction of the superior oblique muscle, causing the eye to have difficulty moving up, particularly during adduction (when eye turns towards the nose). Harold W. Brown first described the disorder in 1950 and initially named it the "superior oblique tendon sheath syndrome".

== Signs and symptoms ==
Harold W. Brown characterized the syndrome in many ways such as:

- Limited elevation in the eye when head is straight up
- Eyes point out in a straight up gaze (divergence in up gaze)
- Widening of the eyelids in the affected eye on adduction
- Head tilts backwards (compensatory chin elevation to avoid double vision)
- Near normal elevation in abduction

== Causes ==
Brown syndrome can be divided in two categories based on the restriction of movement on the eye itself and how it affects the eye excluding the movement:

- Congenital (present at birth) Brown syndrome results from structural anomalies other than a short tendon sheath but other fibrous adhesions may be present around the trochlear area.
- Acquired cases arise from trauma, surgery, sinusitis and inflammation of the superior oblique tendon sheath in rheumatoid arthritis. Orbital floor fractures may trap the orbital tissue in such a way as to simulate Brown syndrome. Intermittent forms of vertical retraction syndrome have been associated with click, which occurs as the restriction is released (superior oblique click syndrome).

== Diagnosis ==
Brown syndrome is usually diagnosed by taking a detailed history and performing physical exams, including certain eye movements.

== Treatments ==
If binocular vision is present and head position is correct, treatment is not obligatory. Treatment is required for: visual symptoms, strabismus, or incorrect head position.

Acquired cases that have active inflammation of the superior oblique tendon may benefit from local corticosteroid injections in the region of the trochlea.

The goal of surgery is to restore free ocular rotations. Various surgical techniques have been used:

- Harold Brown advocated that the superior oblique tendon be stripped. A procedure named sheathotomy. The results of such a procedure are frequently unsatisfactory because of reformation of scar tissue.
- Tenotomy of the superior oblique tendon (with or without a tendon spacer) has also been advocated. This has the disadvantage that it frequently produces a superior oblique paresis.
- Weakening of the inferior oblique muscle of the affected eye may be needed to compensate for iatrogenic fourth nerve palsy.

== Epidemiology ==
In Brown's original series there was a 3:2 predominance of women to men and nearly twice as many cases involved the right eye as the left. 10% of cases showed bilaterality. Familial occurrence of Brown syndrome has been reported.

== See also ==
- Strabismus
- Strabismus surgery
- Pediatric ophthalmology
- Duane syndrome
