= Superior oblique myokymia =

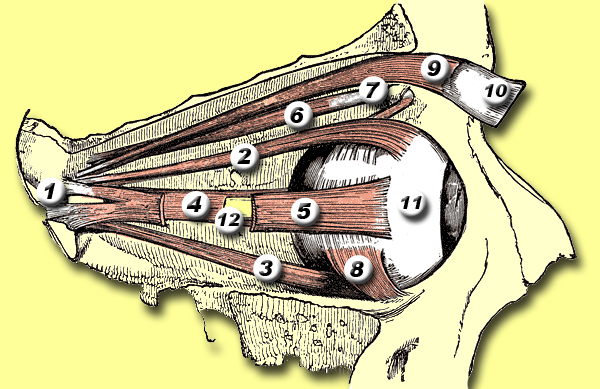
- 6 = Superior oblique muscle
- Specialty: Neurology

Superior oblique myokymia (SOM) is a neurological disorder affecting vision and was named by Hoyt and Keane in 1970.

It is a condition that presents as repeated, brief episodes of movement, shimmering or shaking of the vision of one eye, a feeling of the eye trembling, or vertical/tilted vision. It can present as one or more of these symptoms. Diagnosis is most often made by the elimination of other conditions, disorders or diseases. Onset usually occurs in adulthood, and the cause is benign and is not commonly associated with other disorders.

== Presentation ==
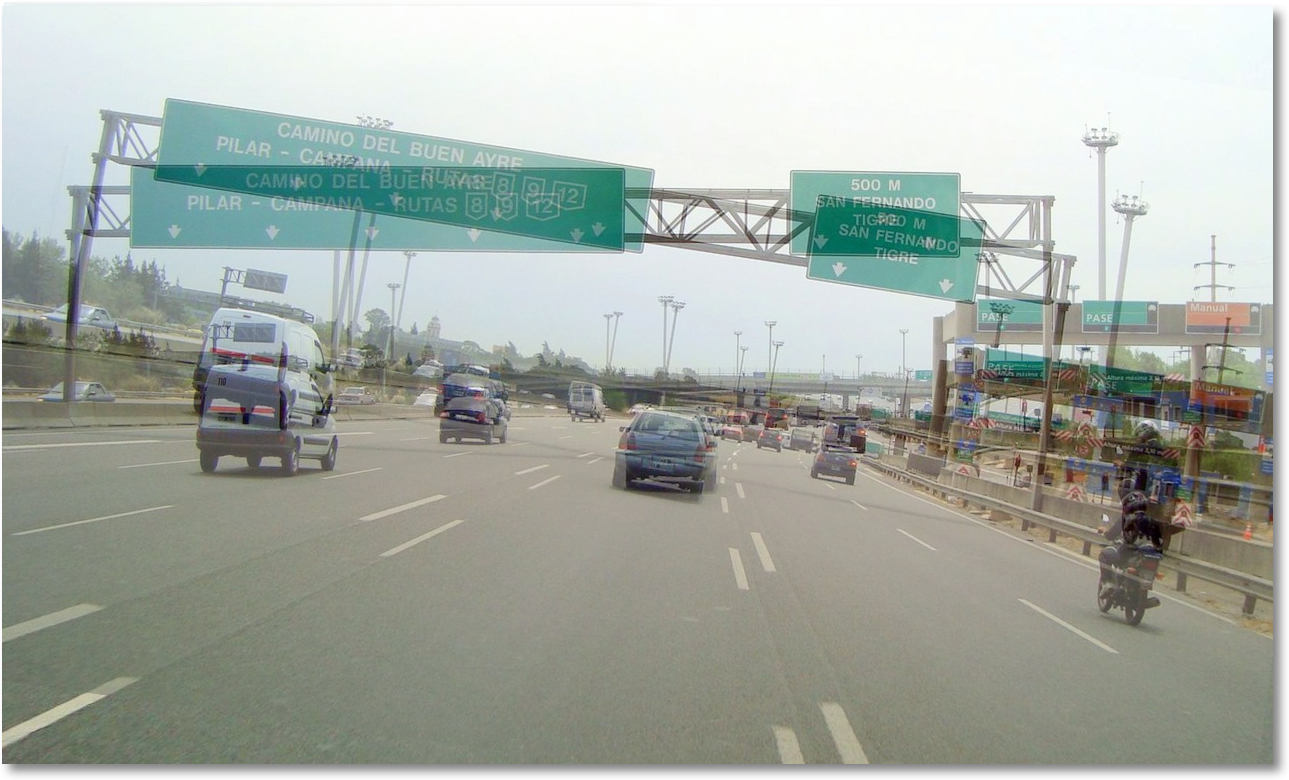
Altered vision by SOM during daylight driving.

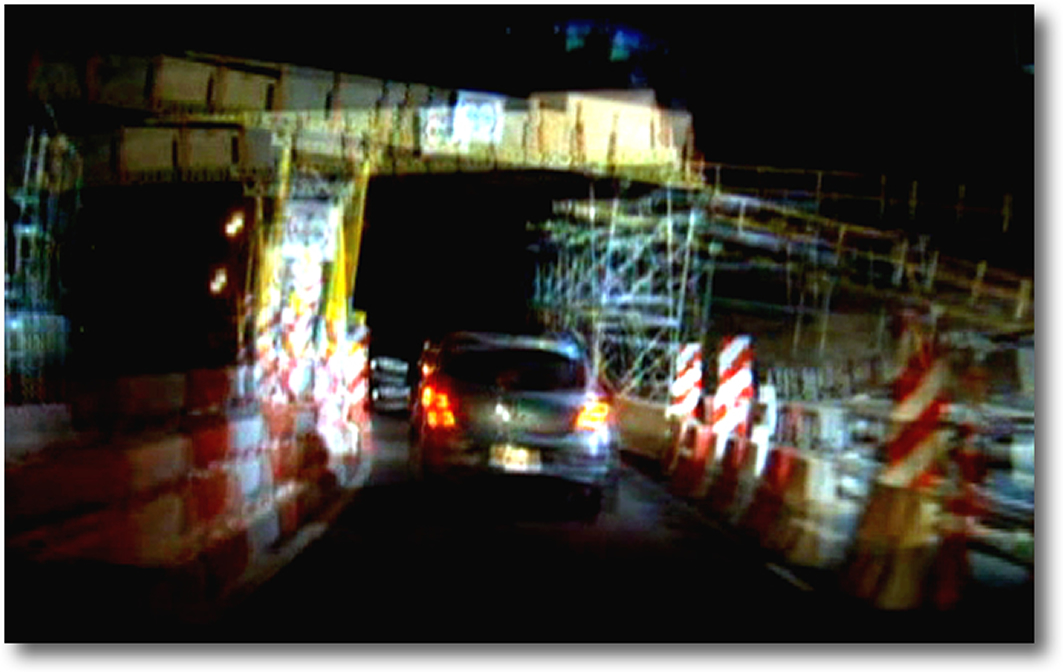
Altered vision by SOM during night driving.

== Causes ==
In 1983, Bringewald postulated that superior oblique myokymia resulted from vascular compression of the trochlear nerve (fourth cranial nerve), which controls the action of the superior oblique muscle in the eye. By 1998, there had been only one reported case of compression of the trochlear nerve by vessels. More recently, magnetic resonance imaging experiments have shown that neurovascular compression at the root exit zone of the trochlear nerve can result in superior oblique myokymia.

== Diagnosis ==
Only recently, diagnostic criteria were proposed. According to these criteria, definite SOM diagnosis requires:

- At least ten episodes with symptoms from at least 2 out of the 3 following symptom categories:
  - Visuo-perceptual, i.e., diplopia, monocular oscillopsia, or monocular reading impairment
  - Ocular motor, i.e., a sensation of involuntary monocular eye-twitching/movement
  - Vestibular-postural, i.e., gait instability or dizziness
- Stereotyped phenomenology in a particular patient
- Duration less than 1 minute
- Videooculographic or clinical confirmation of monocular vertical–torsional nystagmus, typically increased by hyperventilation, triggered by accommodation, and more pronounced in downward or sideward gaze
- Response to treatment with anticonvulsant medication (carbamazepine, oxcarbazepine, lacosamide) or topical beta blockers (levobunolol, timolol, betaxolol, propranolol)

Importantly, the symptoms must not be better accounted for by any other vestibular or neuro-ophthalmological disorder, especially not by vestibular paroxysmia.

== Treatment ==
Treatment can include pharmaceutical or surgical means. The drug carbamazepine (Tegretol) has been used successfully. Other drugs with variable success include gabapentin and, recently, memantine. Successful surgery options include superior oblique tenectomy accompanied by inferior oblique myectomy. However, "[o]verall, the bulk of the ophthalmic literature would agree with the viewpoint that invasive craniotomy surgical procedures should be justified only by the presence of intractable and absolutely unbearable symptoms."

Samii et al. and Scharwey and Samii described a patient who had superior oblique myokymia for 17 years. The interposition of a Teflon pad between the trochlear nerve and a compressing artery and vein at the nerve's exit from the midbrain led to a remission lasting for a follow-up of 22 months.
