= Yakovlevian torque =

Asymmetry of the brain hemispheres

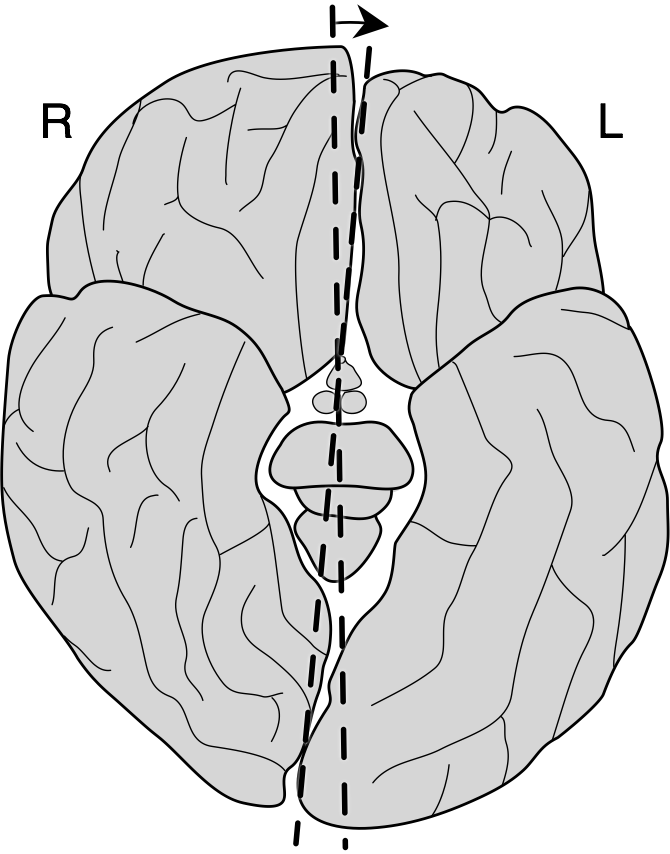
The Yakovlevian torque in the cerebrum (exaggerated). Redrawn from Toga & Thompson (2003).

Yakovlevian torque (also known as occipital bending (OB) or counterclockwise brain torque) is the tendency of the right side of the human brain to be warped slightly forward relative to the left and the left side of the human brain to be warped slightly backward relative to the right. This is responsible for certain asymmetries, such as how the lateral sulcus of the human brain is often longer and less curved on the left side of the brain relative to the right. Stated in another way, Yakovlevian torque can be defined by the existence of right-frontal and left-occipital petalias, which are protrusions of the surface of one hemisphere relative to the other. It is named for Paul Ivan Yakovlev (1894–1983), a Russian-American neuroanatomist from Harvard Medical School.

== Effects ==
=== Handedness ===
A 2012 literature review showed that morphometry studies had consistently found that handedness-related effects corresponded to the extent of the Yakovlevian torque; increased torque, as measured by increased size of the right-frontal petalia and the left-occipital petalia, tends to be more common in right-handed individuals. Individuals with mixed-handedness or left-handedness show reduced levels of Yakovlevian torque. A larger analysis of 17,141 individuals' brains, including over 500 left-handed individuals, found no associations between handedness and brain asymmetry.

=== Developmental stuttering ===
Reduced right-frontal and left-occipital petalias and reversed petalia asymmetries (that is, left-frontal and right occipital petalias) have been associated with developmental stuttering in both adults and pre-adolescent boys. This may be tied to the lateral sulcus housing Broca's area, which plays a significant role in production of language.

=== Bipolar disorder ===
Increased size of the left-occipital petalia, resulting from an abnormally high degree of Yakovlevian torque has been associated with bipolar disorder. Maller et al. 2015 found that increased asymmetry of the occipital lobe, or occipital bending, was four times more prevalent in subjects with bipolar disorder than in healthy controls. This applied both to patients with bipolar disorder type I and type II.

== Development and evolution ==
There is some evidence suggesting that the Yakovlevian torque is related to the aurofacial asymmetry and the contralateral organization of the brain and is due to a not quite complete twist of the anterior part of the head. According to the axial twist theory, each side of the brain represents the opposite body side due to a developmental twist along the body axis.

== Presence in primates ==
Yakovlevian torque is found in modern humans and fossil hominids, appearing reliably as early as Homo erectus. The patterning of petalias in extinct human ancestors is examined via endocasts, wherein a cast is made of the cranial vault: the asymmetries of human ancestors can be measured from these casts because petalias leave impressions inside the cranial vault.

Some authors have reported that similar petalia patterns are found in a number of primates including Old World monkeys, New World monkeys and Great apes, but others report different protrusions; these differences seem to be tied to which techniques are used to measure the petalia, so it is not well-understood if all primates demonstrate Yakovlevian torque.
