= Trochlea of superior oblique =

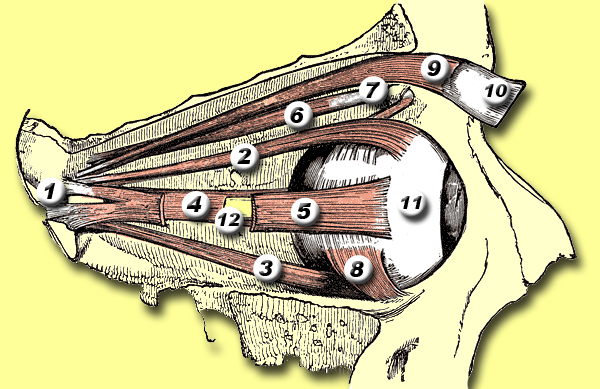
- Rectus muscles: 2 = superior, 3 = inferior, 4 = medial, 5 = lateral Oblique muscles: 6 = superior, 8 = inferior Other muscle: 9 = levator palpebrae superioris Other structures: 1 = Annulus of Zinn, 7 = Trochlea, 10 = Superior tarsus, 11 = Sclera, 12 = Optic nerve

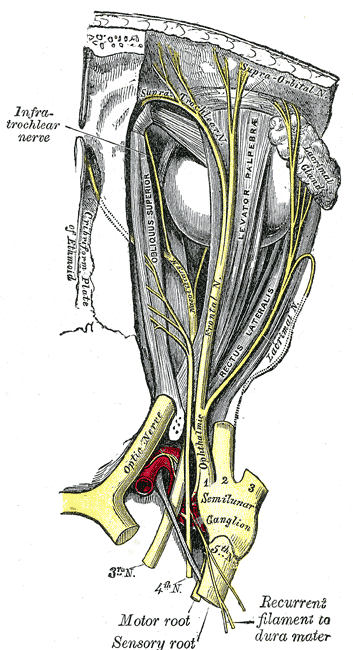
- Nerves of the orbit. Seen from above. (Trochlea visible at upper left but not labeled.)

Details

Identifiers
- Latin: trochlea musculi obliqui superioris bulbi
- TA98: A15.2.07.017
- TA2: 2049
- FMA: 49065

The trochlea of superior oblique is a pulley-like structure in the eye. The tendon of the superior oblique muscle passes through it. It is the only cartilage found in the normal orbit, on the superior nasal aspect of the frontal bone. The word trochlea comes from the Greek word for pulley.

== Actions of the superior oblique muscle ==
To understand the actions of the superior oblique muscle, it is helpful to imagine the eyeball as a sphere that is constrained – like the trackball of a computer mouse – in such a way that only specific rotational movements are possible. Allowable movements for the superior oblique are (1) rotation in a vertical plane – looking down and up (depression and elevation of the eyeball) and (2) rotation in the plane of the face (intorsion and extorsion of the eyeball).

The body of the superior oblique muscle is located behind the eyeball, but the tendon (redirected by the trochlea) approaches the eyeball from the front. The tendon attaches to the top (superior aspect) of the eyeball at an angle of 51 degrees concerning the primary position of the eye (looking straight forward). Therefore, the force of the tendon’s pull has two components: a forward component that tends to pull the eyeball downward (depression) and a medial component that tends to rotate the top of the eyeball toward the nose (intorsion).

The relative strength of these two forces depends on how the eye is looking. When the eye is adducted (looking toward the nose), the force of depression increases. When the eye is abducted (looking away from the nose), the force of intorsion increases, while the force of depression decreases. When the eye is in the primary position (looking straight ahead), contraction of the superior oblique produces depression and intorsion in roughly equal amounts.

To summarize, the actions of the superior oblique muscle are (1) depression of the eyeball, especially when the eye is adducted; and (2) intorsion of the eyeball, especially when the eye is abducted. The clinical consequences of weakness in the superior oblique (caused, for example, by fourth nerve palsies) are discussed below.

This summary of the superior oblique muscle describes its most important functions. However, it is an oversimplification of the actual situation. For example, the tendon of the superior oblique inserts behind the equator of the eyeball in the frontal plane, so muscle contraction also tends to abduct the eyeball (turn it outward). In fact, each of the six extraocular muscles exerts rotational forces in all three planes (elevation-depression, adduction-abduction, intorsion-extorsion) to varying degrees, depending on which way the eye is looking. The relative forces change every time the eyeball moves – every time the direction of the gaze changes. The central control of this process, which involves the continuous, precise adjustment of forces on twelve different tendons to point both eyes in precisely the same direction, is truly remarkable.

The recent discovery of soft tissue pulleys in the orbit – similar to the trochlea, but anatomically more subtle and previously missed – has completely changed (and greatly simplified) our understanding of the actions of the extraocular muscles. Perhaps the most important finding is that a 2-dimensional visual field representation is sufficient for most purposes.

== Additional images ==
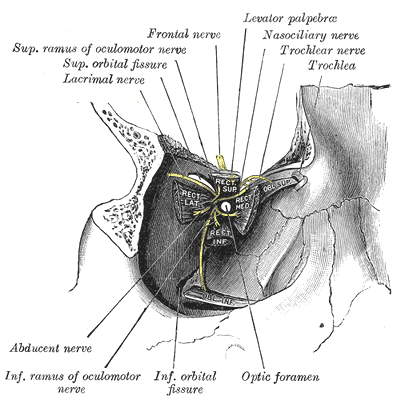
Dissection showing origins of right ocular muscles, and nerves entering by the superior orbital fissure.

== See also ==
- Human eye
- Trochleitis
