= Paul Ivan Yakovlev =

American neuroanatomist (1894–1983)

Paul Ivan Yakovlev, Harvard Medical School yearbook, 1965

Paul Ivan Yakovlev (December 28, 1894 – June 16, 1983) was a Russian-American neuroanatomist who worked at Harvard Medical School. He is the namesake of the Yakovlevian torque, an asymmetry of human brains. He made contributions in the origins of the frontopontine tract in humans, neurocutaneous syndromes and epilepsy, neuronal substrates and epilepsy, schizencephaly, arhinencephalia, intellectual disability, decussation of the bulbar pyramidal tract, frontal lobotomies, the limbic cortex, the time of myelination and the anatomy of the limbic cortex, corpus callosum, and thalamus, and two classic anatomical atlases.

== Biography ==
Yakovlev was born Павел Иванович Яковлев in Vitebsk Region, Belarus, in what was then the Russian Empire. Orphaned at the age of nine, he was raised by an aunt and then attended S. M. Kirov Military Medical Academy in St. Petersburg. He left Russia in 1919 by walking from Leningrad to Finland. Until he was able to obtain a travel visa he made ends meet by working as a dockhand. He earned his doctorate at the University of Paris in 1925. He came to the United States, worked at hospitals and began teaching. His first major lab was at Fernald State School and he wrote some of his "best papers" at Fernald, including works on schizencephalics and paraplegia. He ended up as a clinical professor of neuropathology at Harvard Medical School, with a "huge lab." Yakovlev was a pioneer of "whole brain sectioning" and created a collection of "stained serial sections of whole brain" that remains a research resource in the collection of the National Museum of Health and Medicine in the Armed Forces Institute of Pathology, Washington, D.C. According to the museum, "Yakovlev began the collection in 1930 at Monson State Hospital for Epileptics. In 1974, he transferred the collection from Harvard to the Armed Forces Institute of Pathology, where it was managed by curator Mohamad Haleem until its transfer to the museum." He was known to joke that the collection was "40 tons of glass."

Yakovlev and Maurice Victor collaborated on a translation of Sergei Korsakov's writings.

By all accounts, Yakovlev was a beloved, universally liked figure in the neuropathological community. He was married to Mary McQuaid in 1932. They were the parents of four children, three daughters and a son. Yakovlev died in Takoma Park, Maryland and was buried in Bellevue Cemetery, Harvard.
