= Axial twist theory =

Scientific theory in vertebrate development

Axial twist
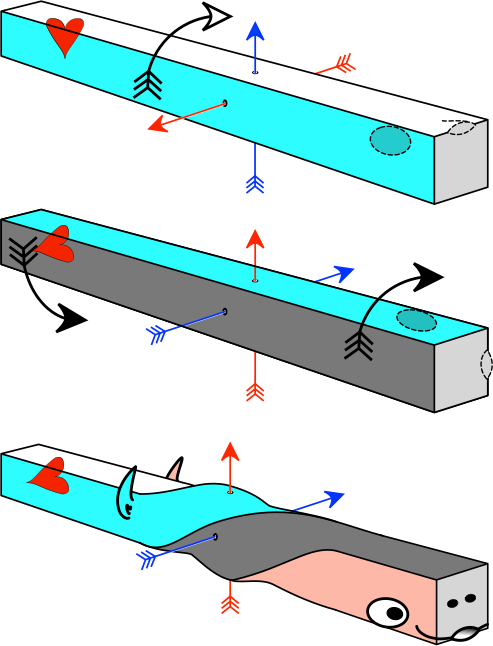
- Schema of the proposed development of the axial twist. Developmental phases are (from top to bottom): (1) the embryo turns on its left side; (2) the anterior head grows in the same direction, but the rest of the body grows oppositely into a twist. So that ultimately (3) external bilateral symmetry is regained. Note that there is no evolutionary pressure for internal symmetry so the heart (and other organs) remain asymmetric.

Details
- System: vertebrate body plan

The axial twist theory (a.k.a. axial twist hypothesis) is a proposed scientific theory to explain the optic chiasm and contralateral brain of vertebrates. It suggests that the rostral part of the head is "turned around" with respect to the rest of the body. This end-part would consist of the face (eyes, nose, and mouth) as well as part of the brain (cerebrum and thalamus). The central nervous system would end up with a 180 degree twist right at the optic chiasm, and other body parts would be slightly moved as well. According to the hypothesis, the vertebrate body has a left-handed chirality.

The axial twist theory competes with a number of other proposals. None of the proposed theories explaining this phenomenon, including axial twist theory, have gained general recognition. No evidence supporting the proposed developmental twist has been found.

According to the axial twist theory, the embryo turns on its left side during development, followed by two 90 degree twists to regain external bilateral symmetry. This leads to a 180 degree turn between the forebrain and midbrain where the optic chiasm is formed.

In order for the optic tracts to connect contralaterally in the optic chiasm, the theory assumes that the retinal axons preferentially target neurons that were closest to them before the twist. Evidence for this strong assumption has not been found, and research suggests that axons function equally well connecting to the mirrored, ipsilateral neurons. The authors of the axial twist theory suggest some "molecular goalposts" to guide axons across the CNS midline, though this assumption is unsubstantiated. Furthermore, the "goalposts" would now be the factors driving the decussation, eliminating the need for a twist to happen at all.

== History ==
In the end of the 19th century, the famous neuroscientist and Nobel Prize winner Santiago Ramón y Cajal proposed a theory to explain the contralateral organization of the brain that was rapidly and widely accepted. This theory, the visual map theory, proposes that the optic chiasm restores the retinal image on the visual cortex. Cajal's theory remained virtually undisputed for more than a century. Research in the early 21st and late 20th centuries mainly focused on the mechanisms of decussation, though several ideas have been proposed to explain the evolutionary benefit.

== Evolution ==
The axial twist is thought to have evolved in a common ancestor of all vertebrates, but the mechanism remains speculative. However, twisting and asymmetric development are well known from other deuterostomes, such as Echinodermata, Cephalochordata, and Tunicata; as well as from gastropods.

De Lussanet and Osse posit two possible evolutionary origins: one, that an ancestral vertebrate turned to its left side during the transition from a free-swimming larva to a bottom-feeding adult stage, like modern-day flatfishes. The other hypothesis is that an ancestor of vertebrates was a bottom-feeder that turned to the left to move around, with this body position evolving to the orientation of the free-swimming last common ancestor. This second hypothesis would connect to the lifecycle of the closely related Cephalochordata, which have a mouth that is initially on the left side before moving to ventral position but lack an axial twist. Following the hypothesis of Dzik et al. (1995), de Lussanet suggests that if the second hypothesis is correct, then the first stage was the enigmatic Ediacaran fossil Dickinsonia, and the second stage is represented by the early Cambrian Yunnanozoon.

Even the most distant clades of vertebrates – the agnathan lampreys and hagfish – possess an optic chiasm and contralateral brain organization, as well as a left-sided heart and asymmetric bowels. Also, every vertebrate has a contralateral organization of the forebrain. Fossil skull impressions of early vertebrates from the Ordovician and later show the presence of an optic chiasm.

== Morphology ==
Caricature showing the external asymmetries due to the axial twist

The axial twist takes place in the early embryo of a vertebrate. There is an evolutionary pressure for animals towards bilateral symmetry, due to sexual selection (better looks to potential mates) and functional selection (e.g., better locomotion). The evolutionary pressure decreases with better symmetry. According to de Lussanet, the pressure decreases as a body part is less associated with the body surface (less sexual selection) and the locomotor system (less functional selection). Consequently, the axial twist theory predicts that small, systematic asymmetries remain on the outside of the body and that these asymmetries are larger on the inside of the body. The groupings of body parts in the hypothesis (the face and brain vs the rest of the body) is speculative. The hypothesis was originally proposed to explain the optic chiasm and the contralateral brain, but other asymmetries in the body can be speculatively connected to the axial twist.

=== Brain torque and spinal asymmetry ===
Opposite rotational asymmetries as viewed from below. Left: the Yakovlevian torque in the cerebrum (exaggerated). Redrawn from Toga & Thompson. Right: the opposite, rightward asymmetry of the thoracal spine. Source: figure 4 of reference

The Yakovlevian torque (a.k.a. "counterclockwise brain torque") refers to an anatomical peculiarity of the normal brain. On average, the frontal lobes are asymmetric to the left (the right lobe appears slightly larger than the left), whereas the occipital lobe is asymmetric to the right; the central sulcus and temporal lobe of the right cortical hemisphere are further to the front than those on the left.

=== Central nervous system decussations ===
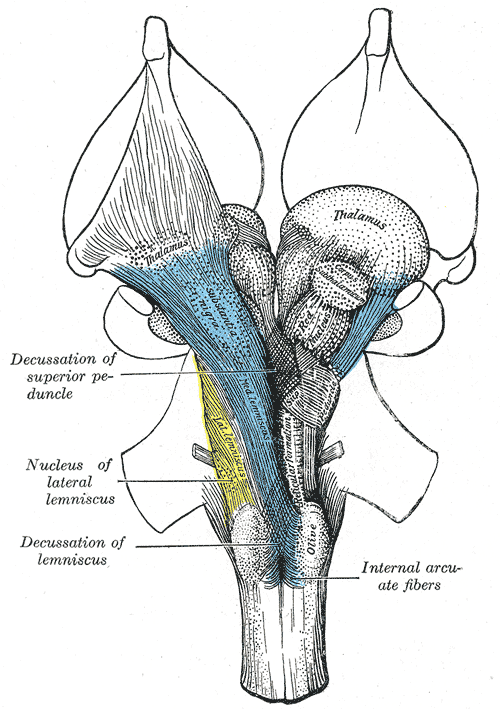
Some afferent decussations.

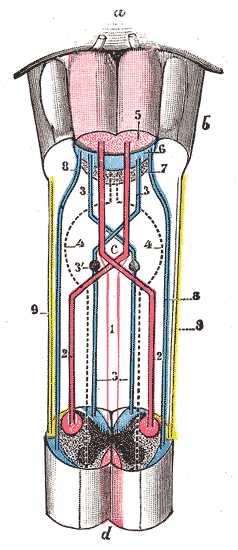
Pyramidal decussations.

Anatomically, the contralateral organization of the forebrain is manifested by major decussations (based upon the Latin notation for ten, 'deca,' as an uppercase 'X') and chiasmas (after the Greek uppercase letter 'Χ,' chi). A decussation denotes a crossing of bundles of axonal fibers inside the central nervous system. As a result of such decussations: The efferent connections of the cerebrum to the basal ganglia, the cerebellum, and the spinal cord are crossed; and the afferent connections from the spine, the cerebellum, and the pons to the thalamus are crossed. Thus, motor, somatosensory, auditory, and visual primary regions in the forebrain predominantly represent the contralateral side of the body.

=== Visual system ===
Four of the cranial nerves serve the eye directly: one sensory and three motor nerves. The optic nerve is sensory and crosses the midline in the optic chiasm. The oculomotor nerve, trochlear nerve, and abducens nerve are motor nerves that control one or more of the eye muscles. The oculomotor nerve crosses the midline before leaving the central nervous system. The trochlear nerve crosses the midline in a chiasma on the dorsal side and the abducens innervates an eye muscle on the same side.

The optic nerve inserts on the optic tectum of the midbrain. In tetrapods and bony fish it also branches off to the LGN of the thalamus in the forebrain, but not in other vertebrates such as sharks and skates). In sharks, the visual center in the cerebrum obtains its fibers from the optic tectum. On the way, these fibers cross the midline again so that each hemisphere of the cerebrum of sharks represents the eye on the same side. The branch towards the LGN exists only in tetrapods and is therefore generally understood as acquired later in the evolution of vertebrates and thus makes an exception.

The abducens nucleus is located in the pons. The abducens nerve innervates the lateral rectus muscle of the eye in most vertebrates, except lampreys and hagfishes. It thus seems that the lateral rectus muscle evolved later and independently of the other eye muscles, and presents an exception to the axial twist model.

=== Olfactory system ===
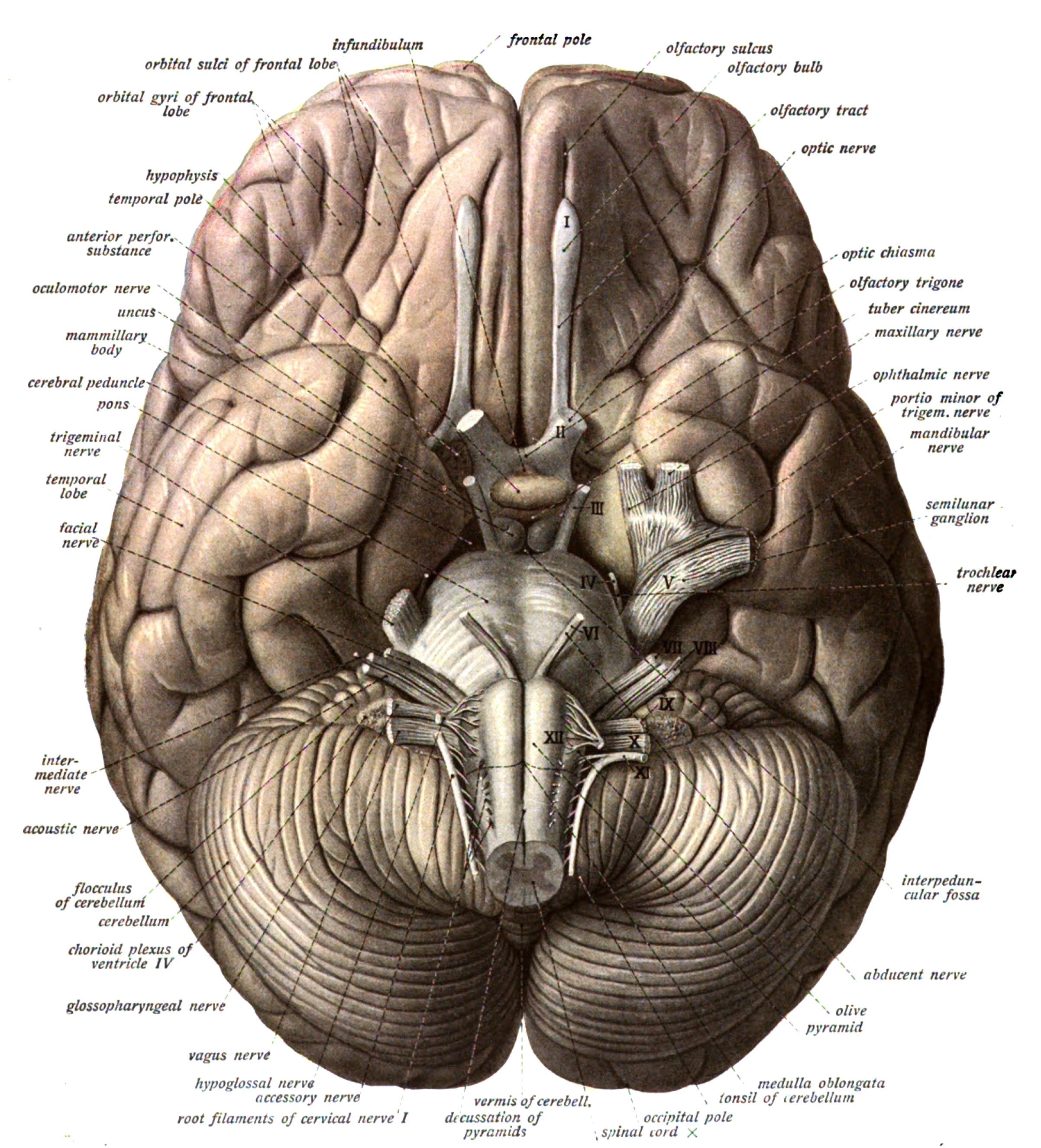
The olfactory (smelling) tracts do not chiasmate

The olfactory tracts run parallel to the optic tract but do not form a chiasm. Accordingly, each olfactory bulb connects to the same-side centers of the frontal cerebrum. This is entirely consistent with the axial twist theory because the nose is part of the anterior head region which twists along with the forebrain. Since the primary olfactory centers are at home in the cerebrum (olfaction is the only sense that originates in the cerebrum), each olfactory lobe is predicted to be represented by the cerebrum on the same side, which is indeed the case: whereas the olfactory tracts neighbour the optic tracts directly they do not chiasmate but insert on the ipsilateral side of the cerebrum (See figure).

=== Aurofacial asymmetry ===
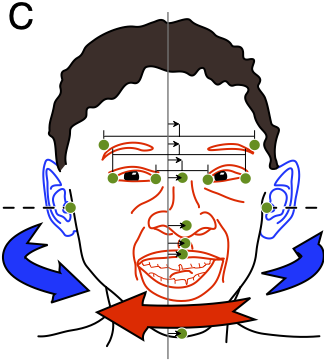
Exaggerated schema of the aurofacial asymmetry as predicted by the axial twist theory. During embryology and development, the face elements (red) are predicted to move toward the center from the left, with respect to the mid-plane between the ears. Source: figure 1c of reference

The aurofacial asymmetry expresses the position of the face (eyes, nose, mouth) with respect to the plane perpendicular to the axis through the ears. As shown in the graph, the asymmetry decreases until the age of 13. Since the axial twist is located between the ears and the face, it is predicted that the face grows from the left to the midline, as is indeed the case.

=== Orientation of internal organs ===
Diagram of the human stomach, intestines, and rectum.

The inner organs of the trunk are the regions on the body that are least mechanically associated with locomotion and the external body, and so are predicted by the axial twist theory to be the most asymmetric regions of the body. Other bilaterally symmetric animals such as insects and annelids are bilaterally symmetric also on the inside. The asymmetric development of the heart is well-researched.

The question of why the heart should have a left-sided orientation, has been topic of scientific research before the axial twist theory was published, but none of the hypotheses could stand critical testing.

The asymmetric orientation and position of the gastrointestinal tract arises during development by rotation (see Development of the digestive system). The lateral positions of the digestive organs are on the same side in all vertebrates liver and gall bladder on the right side and the stomach, pancreas, spleen and the final loop of the colon on the left side.

== Relation to other theories and hypotheses ==
The axial twist theory is not generally accepted. Several other theories have been proposed over the years, though none have been empirically validated or accepted in the field.

=== Inversion hypothesis ===
In 1822 the French zoologist Étienne Geoffroy Saint-Hilaire noted that the organization of dorsal and ventral structures in the crayfish (an arthropod) is opposite that of mammals, and he proposed that mammals and other vertebrates are turned upside down. As explained above, Marcel Kinsbourne proposed that the body (soma) but not the anterior head is inverted (hence somatic twist hypothesis).

There is molecular evidence for the inversion hypothesis in almost all groups of deuterostomes.

=== Somatic twist hypothesis ===
Marcel Kinsbourne's somatic twist hypothesis is most closely related to the axial twist theory. Both theories were presented as an improvement to the dorsoventral inversion hypothesis by the early 19th-century naturalist Étienne Geoffroy Saint-Hilaire.

=== Cajal's visual map theory ===
The visual map theory by Santiago Ramón y Cajal proposes that the optic chiasm restores the retinal image on the visual cortex. Even though the theory is still supported, several studies have pointed out the serious flaws in the theory. Most importantly, the loop of the optic radiation undoes the potential repair of the optic projection on the cortex, which is the central idea of the theory. Also, the theory does not hold for important groups of vertebrates such as sharks because their cerebrum has an ipsilateral visual representation but a contralateral somatosensory and motor representation.

=== Functional theories ===
Functional or topological theories propose that decussations in the brain occur when they are geometrically more efficient or provide some other advantage such as improved coordination between sensory inputs and motor outputs.

== Open questions ==
The axial twist theory is a novel scientific discipline and very few scientific papers have presently addressed it directly. Although a considerable volume of research exists on the genetic and embryological mechanisms of asymmetric development, an open question is how the twist is initiated and how the inversion of the left-right and up-down axes in the anterior head region is established.

The embryology of the twisting has been addressed only rudimentarily in the chick and the zebrafish. The differences in timing and mechanisms across the vertebrate clades are completely unknown.

The evolution of the axial twist is an open question. The founders of the axial twist idea (de Lussanet & Osse, and Kinsbourne) agree that the axial twist is universal in vertebrates and probably is a feature of all chordates. Although the asymmetric development of other chordates such as the lancelet has been studied in detail, no study has analysed this development in the light of the axial twist theory. Moreover, even other deuterostomes, i.e. the echinoderms (sea stars, sea lilies, etc.) show a marked asymmetric development and even an axial twist. This twist has remarkable similarities to that in vertebrates, but no study has addressed this at present. Lastly, the asymmetric and twisted development is well known from gastropods and the relation to asymmetric development in vertebrates is an important question.

It has been proposed that problems in the axial twist development may play a central role in developmental malformations such as holoprosencephaly and scoliosis but these have not been looked into.

== See also ==
- Brain asymmetry
- Contralateral brain
- Inversion (evolutionary biology)
