= Inversion (evolutionary biology) =

Hypothesis in developmental biology

In evolutionary developmental biology, inversion refers to the hypothesis that during the course of animal evolution, the structures along the dorsoventral (DV) axis have taken on an orientation opposite that of the ancestral form.

Inversion was first noted in 1822 by the French zoologist Étienne Geoffroy Saint-Hilaire, when he dissected a crayfish (an arthropod) and compared it with the vertebrate body plan. The idea was heavily criticised, but periodically resurfaced, and is now supported by some molecular embryologists.

== History ==
As early as 1822, the French zoologist Étienne Geoffroy Saint-Hilaire noted that the organization of dorsal and ventral structures in arthropods is opposite that of mammals. Five decades later, in light of Darwin's theory of "descent with modification", German zoologist Anton Dohrn proposed that these groups arose from a common ancestor which possessed a body plan similar to that of modern annelids with a ventral nerve cord and dorsal heart. Whereas this arrangement is retained in arthropods and other protostomes, in chordate deuterostomes, the nerve cord is located dorsally and the heart ventrally. The inversion hypothesis was met with scornful criticism each time it was proposed, and has periodically resurfaced and been rejected. However, some modern molecular embryologists suggest that recent findings support the idea of inversion.

== Evidence for inversion ==
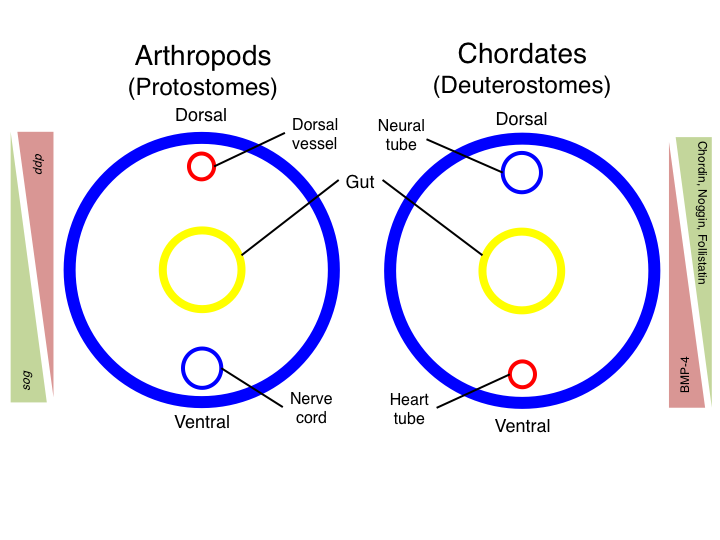
Generalized protostome and chordate body plans illustrating the opposite orientation of dorsoventral structures. Concomitant with the change in orientation of these structures is the inversion of domains of expression of TGF-β signals (dpp/BMPs) and their inhibitors (sog/Chordin).

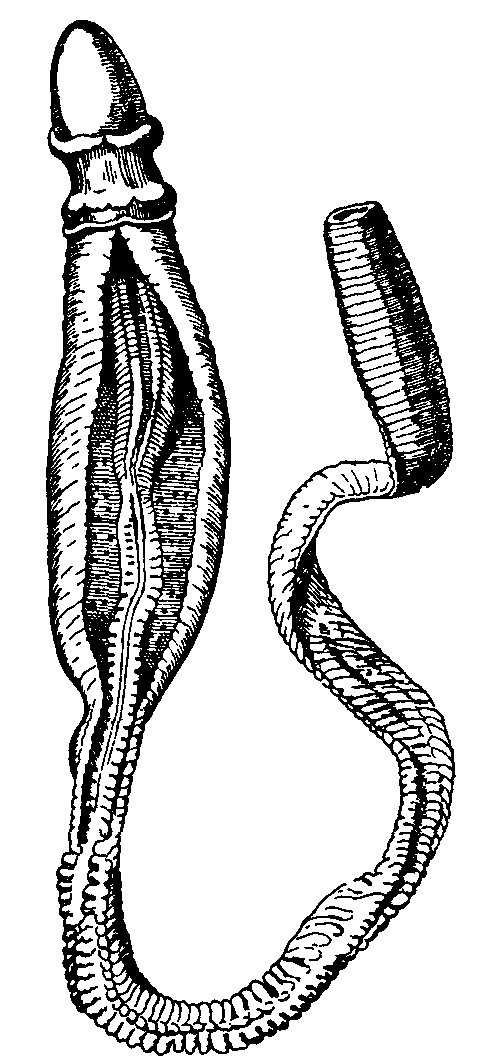
Balanoglossus, an example of a Hemichordata, represents an "evolutionary link" between invertebrates and vertebrates.

In addition to the simple observation that the dorsoventral axes of protostomes and chordates appear to be inverted with respect to each other, molecular biology provides some support for the inversion hypothesis. The most notable piece of evidence comes from analysis of the genes involved in establishing the DV axis in these two groups. In the fruit fly Drosophila melanogaster, as well as in other protostomes, the β-type transforming growth factor (TGF-β) family member decapentaplegic (dpp) is expressed dorsally and is thought to suppress neural fate. On the ventral side of the embryo, a dpp inhibitor, short gastrulation (sog), is expressed, thus allowing nervous tissue to form ventrally. In chordates, the dpp homolog BMP-4 is expressed in the prospective ventral (non-neural) part of the embryo while several sog-like BMP inhibitors (Chordin, Noggin, Follistatin) are expressed dorsally.

Other patterning genes also show conserved domains of expression. The neural patterning genes vnd, ind, msh, and netrin are expressed in the Drosophila ventral nerve cells and midline mesectoderm. The chordate homologs of these genes, NK2, Gsh1/2, Msx1/3, and Netrin, are expressed in the dorsal neural tube. Furthermore, the tinman/Nkx2-5 gene is expressed very early in cells that will become the heart in both Drosophila (dorsally) and chordates (ventrally).

Additional support comes from work on the development of the polychaete annelid Platynereis dumerilii, another protostome. Even more so than Drosophila, its pattern of central-nervous-system development is strikingly similar to that of vertebrates, but inverted. There is also evidence from left-right asymmetry. Vertebrates have a highly conserved Nodal signaling pathway that acts on the left side of the body, determining left-right asymmetries of internal organs. Sea urchins have the same signaling pathway, but it acts on the right side of the body. It was even shown that an opposing right-sided signal for regulating left-right asymmetry in vertebrates, i.e. BMP signaling pathway, is activated on the left side of the sea urchin larva, suggesting an axial inversion during evolution from basal deuterostome to chordate such as amphioxus. The Nodal signaling pathway in amphioxus is on the left side of the embryo, which is the same situation as vertebrates. Sea urchins, like other echinoderms, have radially-symmetric adults, but bilaterally-symmetric larvae. Since sea urchins are deuterostomes, this suggests that the ancestral deuterostome shared its orientation with protostomes, and that dorsoventral inversion originated in some ancestral chordate.

There is evidence that invertebrate chordates are also inverted. Ascidian larvae have a dorsal mouth, as one would expect from inversion. The amphioxus has an odd feature: its mouth appears on the left side and migrates to the ventral side. Biologist Thurston Lacalli speculates that this may be a recapitulation of the migration of the mouth from the dorsal to the ventral side in a protochordate.

=== Hemichordates ===
Some biologists have proposed that the Hemichordates (specifically the Enteropneusta) may represent an intermediate body plan in the evolution of the "inverted" state of the chordates. Though they are considered deuterostomes, the dorsoventral axis of hemichordates retains features of both protostomes and chordates. For example, enteropneusts have an ectodermally-derived dorsal nerve cord in the collar region which has been proposed to be homologous to the chordate neural tube. However, they also have a ventral nerve cord and a dorsal contractile vessel similar to protostomes. Furthermore, the relative positions other "intermediate" structures in hemichordates, such as the hepatic organs and ventral pygochord, which has been proposed to be homologous to the chordate-defining notochord, are retained but inverted. Nübler-Jung and Arendt argue that the principal innovation in the chordate lineage was the obliteration of the mouth on the neural side (as in hemichordates, arthropods, and annelids) and the development of a new mouth on the non-neural ventral side.

== Alternative hypotheses ==
While the idea of dorsoventral axis inversion appears to be supported by morphological and molecular data, others have proposed alternative plausible hypotheses (reviewed in Gerhart 2000). One assumption of the inversion hypothesis is that the common ancestor of protostomes and chordates already possessed an organized central nervous system located at one pole of the dorsoventral axis. Alternatively, this ancestor may have possessed only a diffuse nerve net or several bundles of nervous tissue with no distinct dorsoventral localization. This would mean that the apparent inversion was simply a result of concentration of the central nervous system at opposite poles independently in the lineages leading to protostomes and chordates. Lacalli (1996) suggested a scenario in which the ancestor had a single opening to the digestive system, and that the neural and non-neural mouths arose independently in protostomes and chordates, respectively. By this hypothesis, there is no need for inversion.

Martindale and Henry propose a ctenophore-like ancestor (biradial rather than bilateral) with a concentrated nerve cord and two anal pores on opposite sides of the animal in addition to a terminal gut opening. If one of these pores became the mouth in protostomes and the other became the mouth in deuterostomes, this would also preclude inversion. Another alternative, proposed by von Salvini-Plawen, states that the ancestor had a two-part nervous system - one part concentrated, the other diffuse. The nervous systems of protostome and deuterostome descendants of this ancestor may have arisen independently from these two distinct parts.

The Axial Twist theory proposes that not the whole body, but only the anterior region of the head is inverted. These theories by Kinsbourne and de Lussanet & Osse also explain the presence of an optic chiasm in vertebrates and the contralateral organization of the forebrain. One of these theories is supported by developmental evidence and even explains the asymmetric organization of the heart and bowels.
