= Cerebrum =

Large part of the brain containing the cerebral cortex

- The lobes of the cerebrum include the frontal (blue), temporal (green), occipital (red), and parietal (yellow) lobes. The cerebellum (unlabeled) is not part of the telencephalon.

- Diagram depicting the main subdivisions of the embryonic vertebrate brain.

Details
- Pronunciation: /ˈsɛrɪbrəm/, /sɪˈriːbrəm/
- Artery: Anterior cerebral, middle cerebral, posterior cerebral
- Vein: Cerebral veins

Identifiers
- Latin: cerebrum
- MeSH: D054022
- NeuroLex ID: birnlex_1042
- TA98: A14.1.03.008; A14.1.09.001
- TA2: 5416
- TH: H3.11.03.6.00001
- TE: E5.14.1.0.2.0.12
- FMA: 62000

The cerebrum (pl.: cerebra), telencephalon or endbrain is the largest part of the brain, containing the cerebral cortex (of the two cerebral hemispheres) as well as several subcortical structures, including the hippocampus, basal ganglia, and olfactory bulb. In the human brain, the cerebrum is the uppermost region of the central nervous system. The cerebrum develops prenatally from the forebrain (prosencephalon). In mammals, the dorsal telencephalon, or pallium, develops into the cerebral cortex, and the ventral telencephalon, or subpallium, becomes the basal ganglia. The cerebrum is also divided into approximately symmetric left and right cerebral hemispheres.

With the assistance of the cerebellum, the cerebrum controls all voluntary actions in the human body. Voluntary actions are things that one chooses to do, such as moving or talking, as opposed to involuntary actions that happen without thinking about it, like breathing and blinking.

== Structure ==
Location of the human cerebrum (red).

The cerebrum is the largest part of the brain. Depending upon the position of the animal, it lies either in front or on top of the brainstem. In humans, the cerebrum is the largest and best-developed of the five major divisions of the brain.

The cerebrum is made up of the two cerebral hemispheres and their cerebral cortices (the outer layers of grey matter), and the underlying regions of white matter. Its subcortical structures include the hippocampus, basal ganglia and olfactory bulb. The cerebrum consists of two C-shaped cerebral hemispheres, separated from each other by a deep fissure called the longitudinal fissure.

=== Cerebral cortex ===
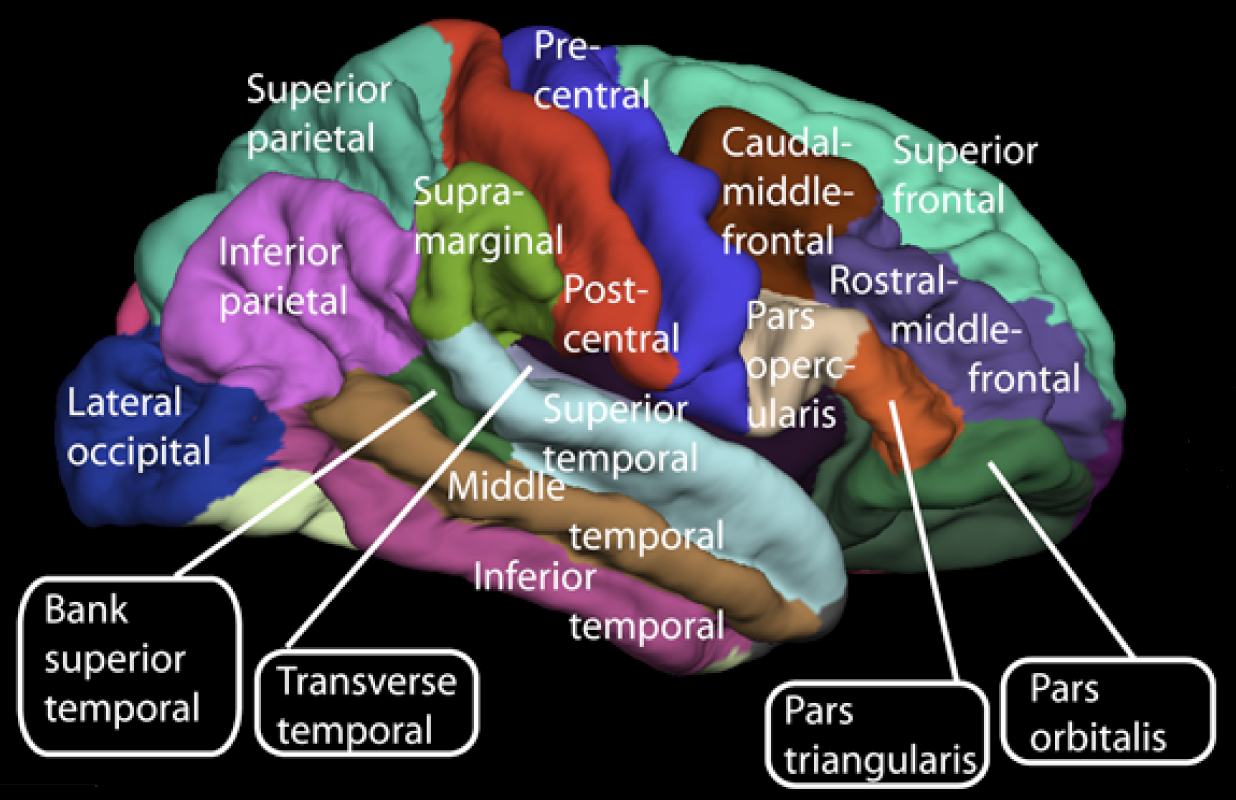
Surface of the cerebrum

The cerebral cortex, the outer layer of grey matter of the cerebrum, is found only in mammals. In larger mammals, including humans, the surface of the cerebral cortex folds to create gyri (ridges) and sulci (furrows) which increase the surface area.

The cerebral cortex is generally classified into four lobes: the frontal, parietal, occipital and temporal lobes. The lobes are classified based on their overlying neurocranial bones. A smaller lobe is the insular lobe, a part of the cerebral cortex folded deep within the lateral sulcus that separates the temporal lobe from the parietal and frontal lobes, is located within each hemisphere of the mammalian brain.

=== Cerebral hemispheres ===
The cerebrum is divided by the medial longitudinal fissure into two cerebral hemispheres, the right and the left. The cerebrum is contralaterally organized, i.e., the right hemisphere controls and processes signals (predominantly) from the left side of the body, while the left hemisphere controls and processes signals (predominantly) from the right side of the body. According to current knowledge, this is due to an axial twist that occurs in the early embryo. There is a strong but not complete bilateral symmetry between the hemispheres, while lateralization tends to increase with increasing brain size. The lateralization of brain function looks at the known and possible differences between the two.

== Development ==
In the developing vertebrate embryo, the neural tube is subdivided into four unseparated sections which then develop further into distinct regions of the central nervous system; these are the prosencephalon (forebrain), the mesencephalon (midbrain) the rhombencephalon (hindbrain) and the spinal cord. The prosencephalon develops further into the telencephalon and the diencephalon. The dorsal telencephalon gives rise to the pallium (cerebral cortex in mammals and reptiles) and the ventral telencephalon generates the basal ganglia. The diencephalon develops into the thalamus and hypothalamus, including the optic vesicles (future retina). The dorsal telencephalon then forms two lateral telencephalic vesicles, separated by the midline, which develop into the left and right cerebral hemispheres. Birds and fish have a dorsal telencephalon, like all vertebrates, but it is generally unlayered and therefore not considered a cerebral cortex. Only a layered cytoarchitecture can be considered a cortex.

== Functions ==
Note: As the cerebrum is a gross division with many subdivisions and sub-regions, it is important to state that this section lists only functions that the cerebrum as a whole serves. (See main articles on cerebral cortex and basal ganglia for more information.) The cerebrum is a major part of the brain, controlling emotions, hearing, vision, personality and much more. It controls all precision of voluntary actions, and it functions as the center of sensory perception, memory, thoughts and judgement; the cerebrum also functions as the center of voluntary motor activities.

=== Motor functions ===
Upper motor neurons in the primary motor cortex which is located in the frontal lobe, send their axons to the brainstem and spinal cord to synapse on the lower motor neurons, which innervate the muscles. Through this connection signals from the Cerebrum control voluntary movements of the body. Damage to upper motor neurons can lead to lesions called upper motor neuron lesions. These lesions result in muscle weakness, spasticity, hyperreflexia, and Babinski sign.

== Sensory processing ==
The cerebrum takes in information from the senses and combines it, so the brain can understand the world as one picture. The main sensory areas notice basic details, while nearby areas put the information together and explain it.

- Visual – The main visual area (V1) in the occipital lobe notices edges, colors, and movement. Nearby areas (V2–V5) help the brain recognize objects and faces.
- Auditory – The main hearing area in the upper temporal lobe senses the pitch and loudness of sounds. Nearby areas then help the brain process more complex sounds like speech and music.
- Somatosensory The main touch area in the parietal lobe maps feelings like touch, pain, temperature, and body position. Each body part has a matching area in the brain, and nearby regions help with spatial awareness and using objects.
- Gustatory The brain senses taste in the insula and frontal areas, then sends this information to the orbitofrontal cortex, where flavors are combined and understood.
- Multisensory integration Areas in the parietal and temporal lobes combine information from different senses to guide how we see, hear, and act.

Lesions Damage in these areas can cause problems like loss of part of vision, trouble hearing, not recognizing objects by touch, or ignoring one side of space.

=== Olfaction ===
The olfactory bulb, responsible for the sense of smell, takes up a large area of the cerebrum in most vertebrates. However, in humans, this part of the brain is much smaller and lies underneath the frontal lobe. The olfactory sensory system is unique since the neurons in the olfactory bulb send their axons directly to the olfactory cortex, rather than to the thalamus first. Olfaction is also the only sense that is represented by the ipsilateral side of the brain, where most sensory input is processed on the same side of the brain; however, the interhemispheric connections allow for bilateral integration of odor information. Damage to the olfactory bulb results in a loss of olfaction (the sense of smell). After this information passes through the olfactory cortex, it is processed in the orbitofrontal cortex, which evaluates the identity and the reward value of odors. Damage to the orbitofrontal cortex can impair the ability to properly evaluate and respond to the reward value of odors, affecting how smells influence motivation and decision making.

=== Language and communication ===
Speech and language are mainly attributed to parts of the cerebral cortex. Motor portions of language are attributed to Broca's area within the frontal lobe. Speech comprehension is attributed to Wernicke's area, at the temporal-parietal lobe junction. These two regions are interconnected by a large white matter tract, the arcuate fasciculus. Damage to the Broca's area results in expressive aphasia (non-fluent aphasia) while damage to Wernicke's area results in receptive aphasia (also called fluent aphasia).

=== Learning and memory ===
Memory is one of the higher intellectual functions of the brain and definitive for the human experience. The prefrontal cortex contributes to set of physiologic functions called "working memory". "Working memory" is what is used to describe the information we store relating to problem-solving which may include filtering our actions according to social norms or ethical and moral consensus, considering the outcomes of our actions before acting upon our thoughts, and planning for the future. It is intuitive to the human experience that different bits of information are stored as memories with different "expiration dates", this of course can be traced to neural activity in relevance to whether a memory is short, intermediate, or long term. Our brains are constantly showered with sensory input and it is a crucial brain function to ignore irrelevant information. That is called habituation. In the case of short-term memory, a newly introduced name or a plate number of a passing car, such information can only be retained for a matter of seconds and possibly extended to a few minutes. The proposed theory to explain the underlying mechanism is (1) continuous neural activity in a reverberating circuit, (2) facilitation or inhibition induced by activation of presynaptic terminals (3) enhanced by calcium accumulation. On the other hand, intermediate-term memory can result from both temporary chemical and physical changes in either presynaptic or postsynaptic membranes that may persist from a few to minutes up to several weeks. Essentially, there is a facilitation in transmission at the level of the synapse by a complementary facilitator terminal to the "mainstream" sensory terminal. Neurotransmitter release is exacerbated by increasing the calcium entry to sensory terminal. It starts with the facilitator terminal releasing serotonin activating adenyl cyclase which forms cyclic adenosine in the main sensory terminal causing the release of protein kinase this enzyme in turn phosphorylates the protein that blocks potassium channels in the terminal decreasing potassium conductance and prolonging the action potential. Long-term memory is credited to structural changes including increase in synaptic vesicles release sites, increase in the vesicles themselves, increase in the synaptic terminals, and change in shape or number of postsynaptic spines all of which either enhance or suppress signal conduction.

Explicit or declarative (factual) memory formation is attributed to the hippocampus and associated regions of the medial temporal lobe. This association was originally described after a patient known as HM had both his left and right hippocampus surgically removed to treat chronic temporal lobe epilepsy. After surgery, HM had anterograde amnesia, or the inability to form new memories.

Implicit or procedural memory, such as complex motor behaviors, involves the basal ganglia.

Short-term or working memory involves association areas of the cortex, especially the dorsolateral prefrontal cortex, as well as the hippocampus.

== Other animals ==
=== Fish ===
In the most primitive vertebrates, the hagfishes and lampreys, the cerebrum is a relatively simple structure receiving nerve impulses from the olfactory bulb. In cartilaginous and lobe-finned fishes and also in amphibians, a more complex structure is present, with the cerebrum being divided into three distinct regions. The lowermost (or ventral) region forms the basal nuclei, and contains fibres connecting the rest of the cerebrum to the thalamus. Above this, and forming the lateral part of the cerebrum, is the paleopallium, while the uppermost (or dorsal) part is referred to as the archipallium. The cerebrum remains largely devoted to olfactory sensation in these animals, in contrast to its much wider range of functions in amniotes.

In ray-finned fishes, the structure is somewhat different. The inner surfaces of the lateral and ventral regions of the cerebrum bulge up into the ventricles; these include both the basal nuclei and the various parts of the pallium and may be complex in structure, especially in teleosts. The dorsal surface of the cerebrum is membranous, and does not contain any nervous tissue.

=== Reptiles ===
In reptiles, the cerebral cortex has three layers. Molecular studies using single-cell transcriptomics have confirmed that all cortices of modern reptiles share a three-layered structure that likely corresponds to the ancestral cortex present in the common ancestor of reptiles, birds, and mammals some 320 million years ago. The paleopallium is much larger than in amphibians and its growth has pushed the basal nuclei into the central regions of the cerebrum. As in the lower vertebrates, the grey matter is generally located beneath the white matter, but in some reptiles, it spreads out to the surface to form a primitive cortex, especially in the anterior part of the brain.

=== Birds ===
The cerebra of birds are similarly enlarged to those of mammals, by comparison with reptiles. Bird brains were once thought to have enlarged basal ganglia and no cortex, but it is now believed that the avian pallium is homologous to the mammalian neocortex. Birds appear to have undergone an alternate process of encephalization, as they diverged from the other archosaurs, with few clear parallels to that experienced by mammals and their therapsid ancestors.

=== Mammals ===
In mammals, this development proceeds further, so that the cortex covers almost the whole of the cerebral hemispheres, especially in more developed species, such as the primates. The paleopallium is pushed to the ventral surface of the brain, where it becomes the olfactory lobes, while the archipallium becomes rolled over at the medial dorsal edge to form the hippocampus. In placental mammals, a corpus callosum also develops, further connecting the two hemispheres. The corpus callosum is considered the most recently evolved structure in the placental mammalian brain. The complex convolutions of the cerebral surface (see gyrus, gyrification) are also found only in higher mammals. Although some large mammals (such as elephants) have particularly large cerebra, dolphins are the only species (other than humans) to have cerebra accounting for as much as 2 percent of their body weight.

== Additional images ==
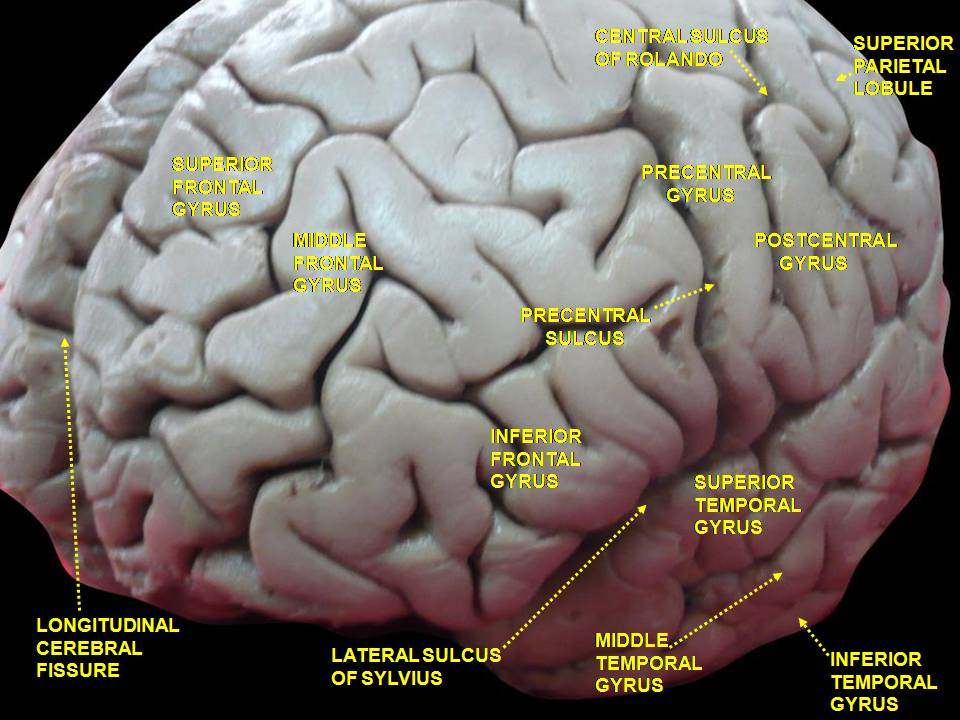
Cerebrum. Lateral face. Deep dissection.

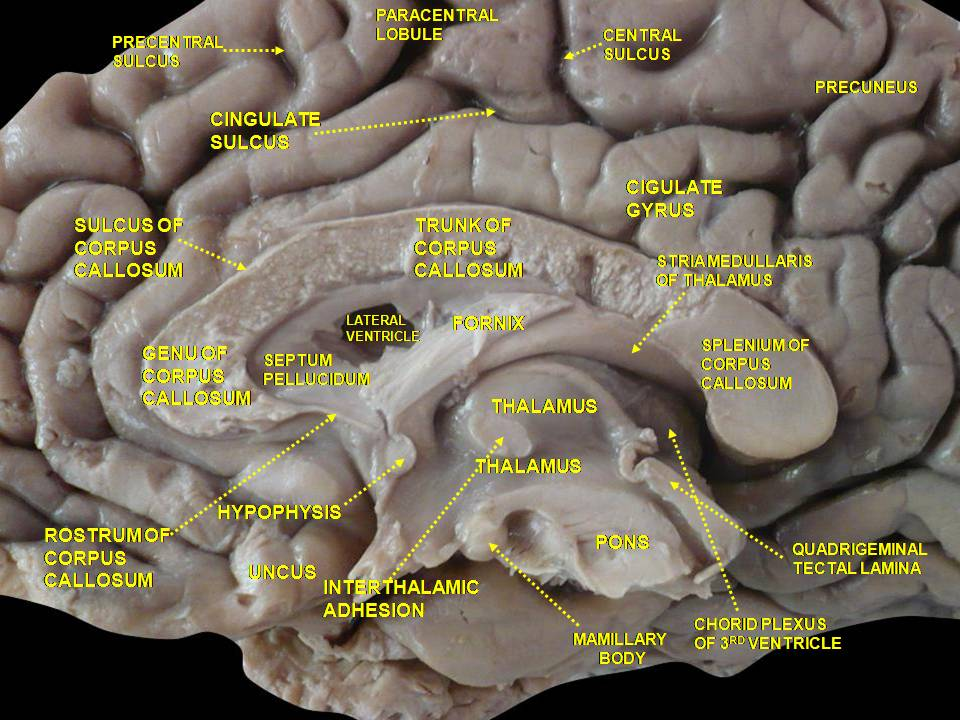
Cerebrum. Medial face. Deep dissection.

== See also ==
- List of regions in the human brain
