= Superior oblique muscle =

Part of the eye

Superior oblique
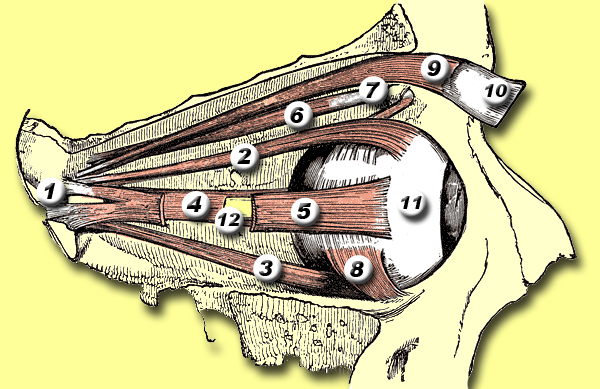
- Recti muscles: 2 = superior, 3 = inferior, 4 = medial, 5 = lateral Oblique muscles: 6 = superior, 8 = inferior Other muscle: 9 = levator palpebrae superioris Other structures: 1 = Annulus of Zinn, 7 = Trochlea, 10 = Superior tarsus, 11 = Sclera, 12 = Optic nerve

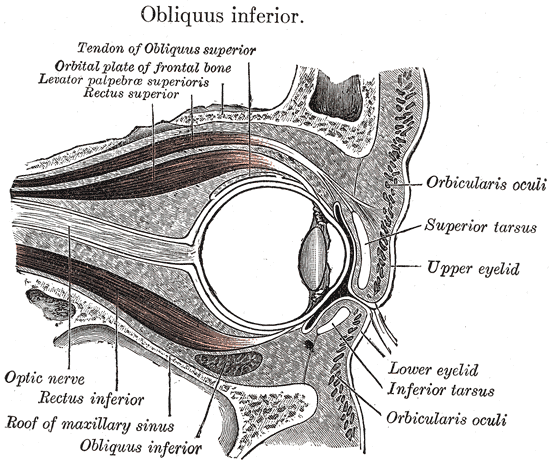
- Sagittal section of right orbital cavity

Details
- Origin: Sphenoid bone at the orbital apex, medial to optic canal
- Insertion: Outer posterior quadrant of the eyeball
- Artery: Lateral muscular branch of the ophthalmic artery
- Nerve: Trochlear nerve
- Actions: Primary action is intorsion (medial rotation); secondary actions are to abduct and depress the eyeball (i.e. it makes the eye move outward and downward)

Identifiers
- Latin: musculus obliquus superior bulbi
- TA98: A15.2.07.016
- TA2: 2048
- FMA: 49039

The superior oblique muscle or obliquus oculi superior is a fusiform muscle originating in the upper, medial side of the orbit (i.e. from beside the nose) which abducts, depresses and internally rotates the eye. It is the only extraocular muscle innervated by the trochlear nerve (the fourth cranial nerve).

== Structure ==
The superior oblique muscle loops through a pulley-like structure (the trochlea of superior oblique) and inserts into the sclera on the posterotemporal surface of the eyeball. It is the pulley system that gives superior oblique its actions, causing depression of the eyeball despite being inserted on the superior surface.

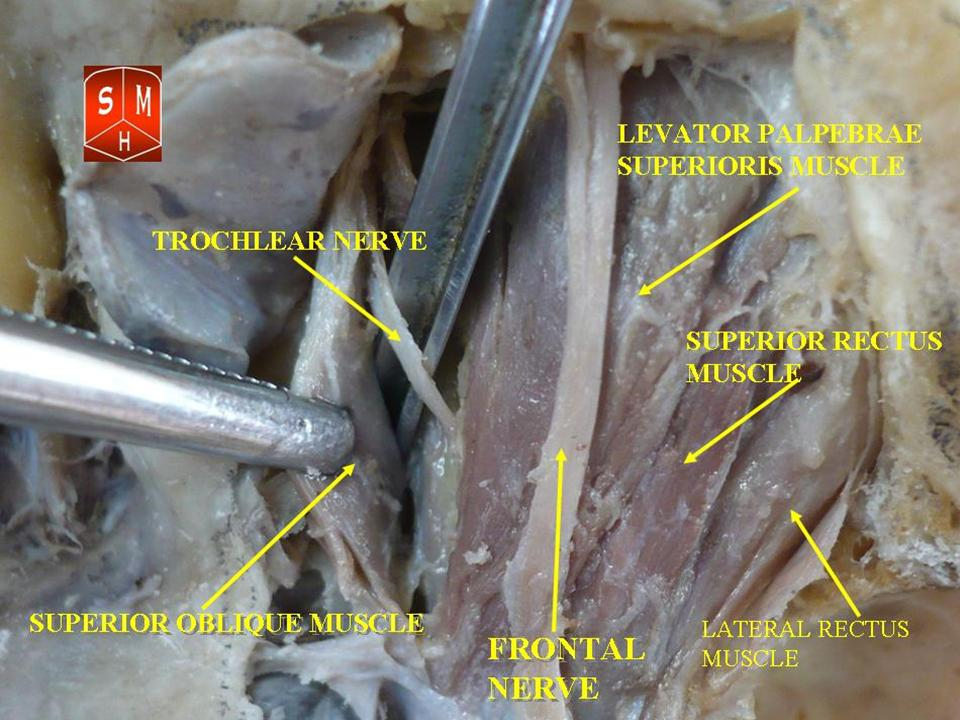
Superior oblique nerve

The superior oblique arises immediately above the margin of the optic foramen, superior and medial to the origin of the superior rectus, and, passing forward, ends in a rounded tendon, which plays in a fibrocartilaginous ring or pulley attached to the trochlear fossa of the frontal bone.

The contiguous surfaces of the tendon and ring are lined by a delicate mucous sheath, and enclosed in a thin fibrous investment.

The tendon is reflected caudally, laterally, and inferiorly beneath the superior rectus to the lateral part of the bulb of the eye, and is inserted onto the scleral surface, behind the equator of the eyeball, the insertion of the muscle lying between the superior rectus and lateral rectus.

== Function ==
The primary (main) action of the superior oblique muscle is intorsion (internal rotation), the secondary action is depression (primarily in the adducted position) and the tertiary action is abduction (lateral rotation).

The extraocular muscles rotate the eyeball around vertical, horizontal and antero-posterior axes. Extraocular muscles other than the medial rectus and lateral rectus have more than one action due to the angle they make with the optical axis of the eye while inserting into the eyeball. The superior and inferior oblique muscles make an angle of 51 degrees with the optical axis.

The depressing action of superior oblique (making the eye look down towards the mouth) is most effective when the eye is in an adducted position. This is because as the eye is abducted (looks laterally), the contribution made by superior oblique to depression of the eye decreases, as the inferior rectus muscle causes this movement more directly and powerfully. The main muscle for abduction is the lateral rectus, so although superior oblique contributes to a downwards and lateral eye movement, testing this motion would not be specific enough as inferior and lateral recti muscles would also be tested. Therefore, during neurological examinations, the superior oblique is tested by having the patient look inwards and downwards, testing only the depressing action of the muscle. This is a source of confusion on the subject as although clinical testing asks the patient to adduct and depress the eye, anatomically the muscle depresses and abducts it.

The great importance of intorsion and extorsion produced by the two oblique muscles can only be understood when it is considered with regards to the other muscle actions present. The two obliques prevent the eye from rotating about its long axis (retina to pupil) when the superior and inferior rectus muscles contract. This is because the orbit does not face directly forwards- the centre-line of the orbit is a little over 20 degrees out from the mid-line. But because the eyes do face forwards, when acting alone, as well as making the eye look up, superior rectus causes it to rotate slightly about the long axis, so the top of the eye moves medially (intorsion). Similarly, in addition to making the eye look down, inferior rectus would cause the eye to rotate about the long axis so the top of the eye moves slightly laterally (extorsion), if acting alone. Clearly this is undesirable as our vision would rotate when we looked up and down. For this reason, these two rectus muscles work in conjunction with the two obliques. When acting alone, superior oblique causes intorsion, inferior oblique, extorsion. Hence, when inferior rectus contracts so we look down, superior oblique also contracts to prevent extorsion of the eye, and when superior rectus contracts so we look up, inferior oblique contracts to prevent intorsion, thus the undesired rotatory actions of the inferior and superior recti about the long axis of the eye are cancelled out. This keeps our vision horizontally level, irrespective of eye position in the orbit.

A montage of five pictures of the right eye of a male subject with partial heterochromia, demonstrating torsional eye movement

== Clinical significance ==
Superior oblique palsy is a common complication of closed head trauma. Restriction of superior oblique relaxation movement due to an inelastic tendon is found in Brown syndrome, leading to difficulty elevating the eye in the adducted position.

Superior oblique myokymia is an uncommon neurological condition caused by vascular compression of the trochlear nerve resulting in repeated, brief, involuntary episodes of movement of the eye.

Surgical operations of the superior oblique include tenotomy, recession, silicone expander lengthening, split tendon lengthening, tucking, and the Harada-Ito procedure.

== Additional images ==
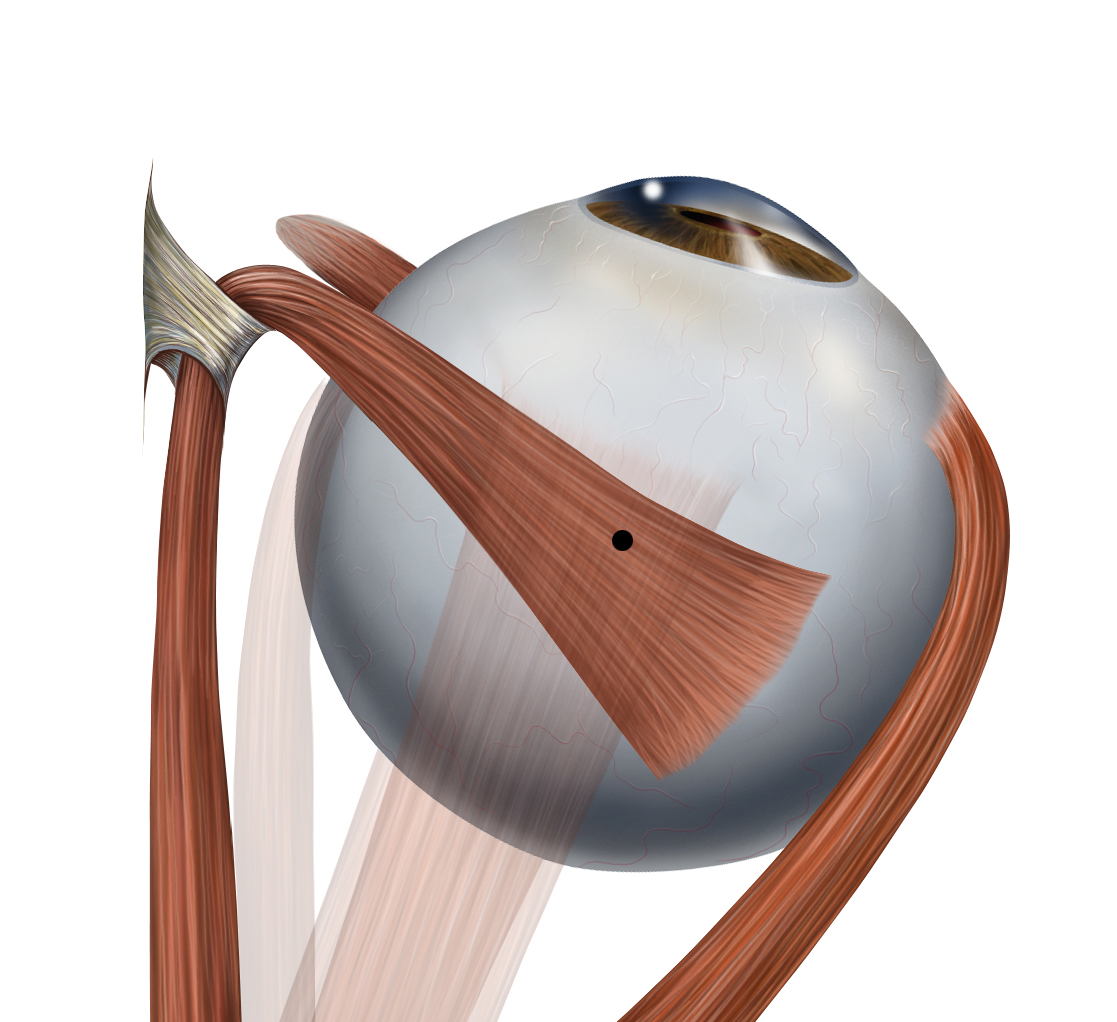
Eye movement of lateral rectus muscle, superior view

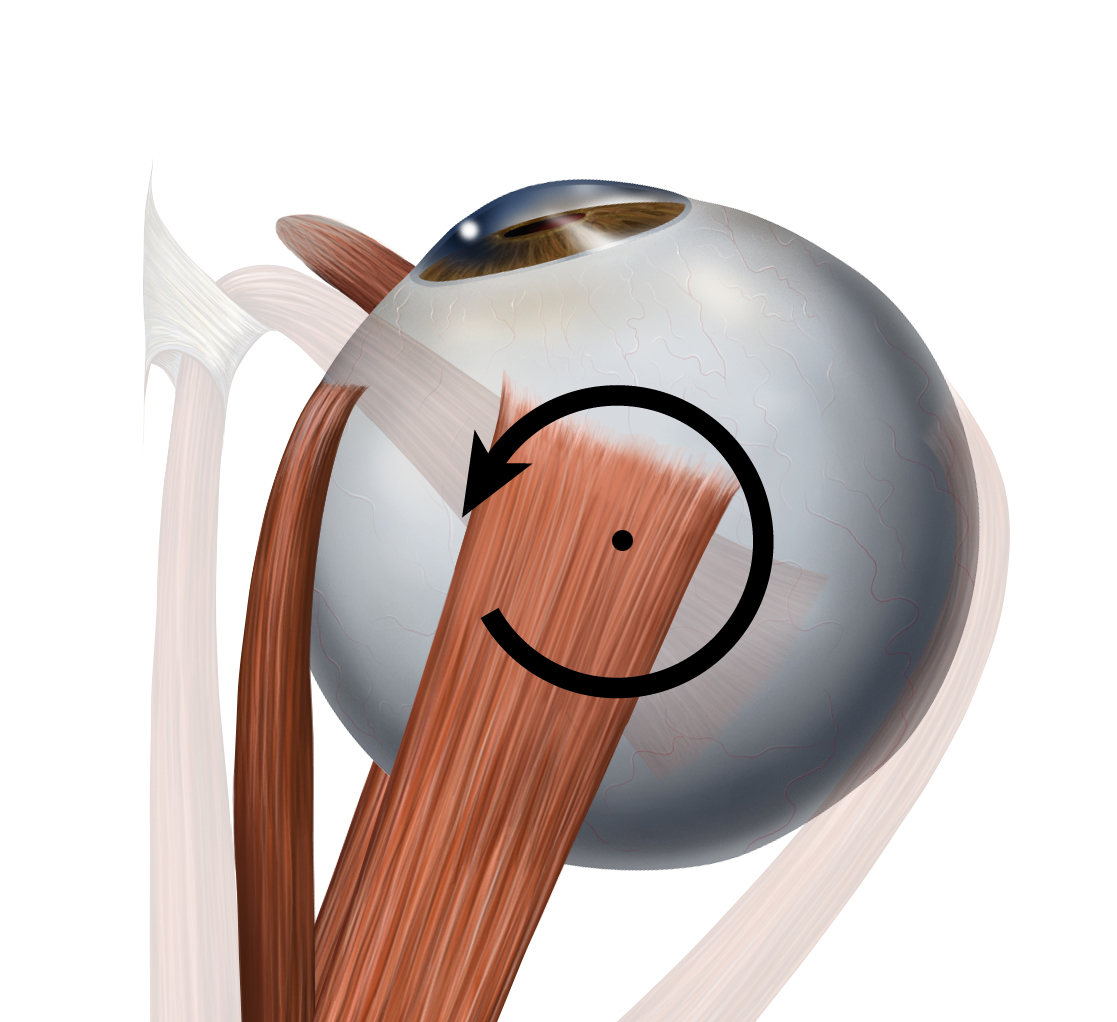
Eye movement of medial rectus muscle, superior view

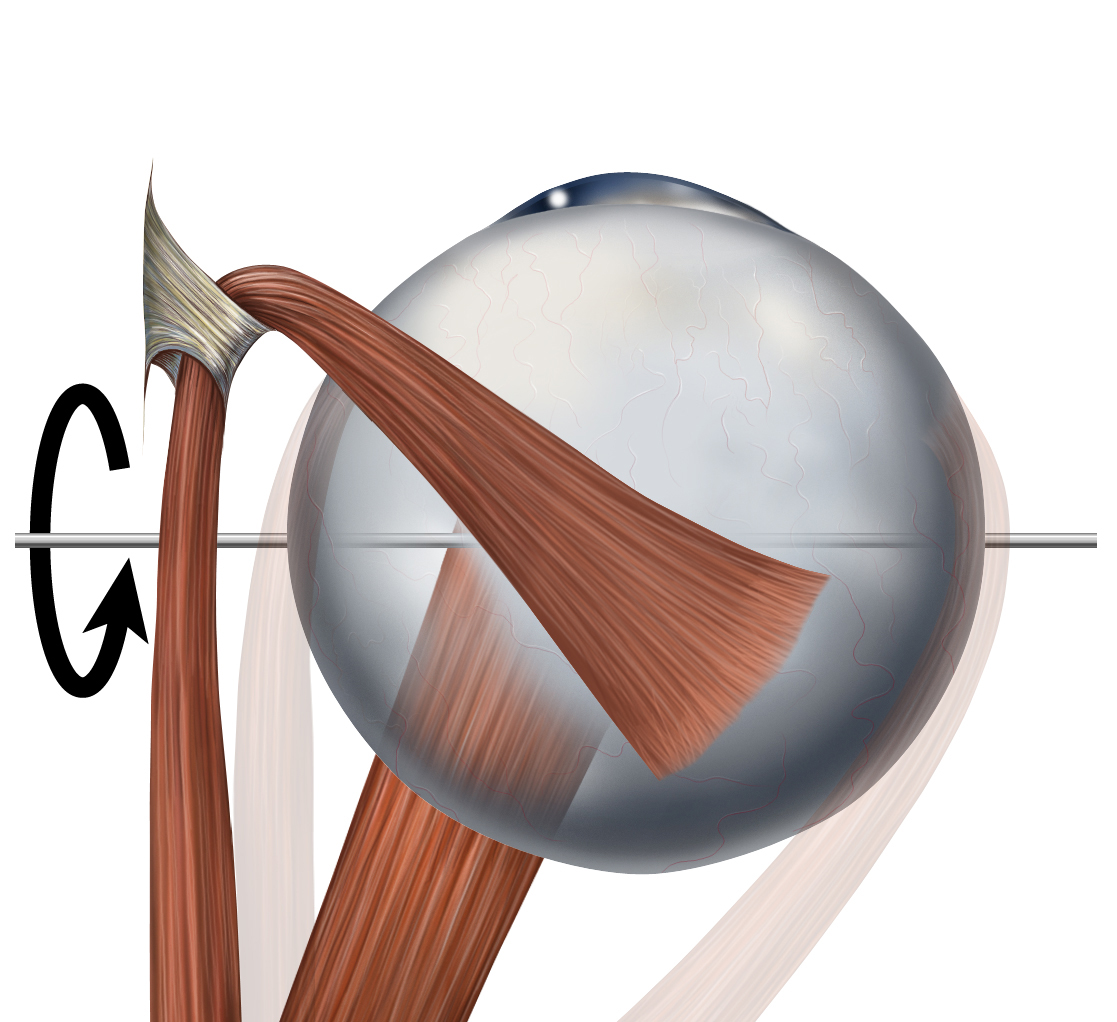
Eye movement of inferior rectus muscle, superior view

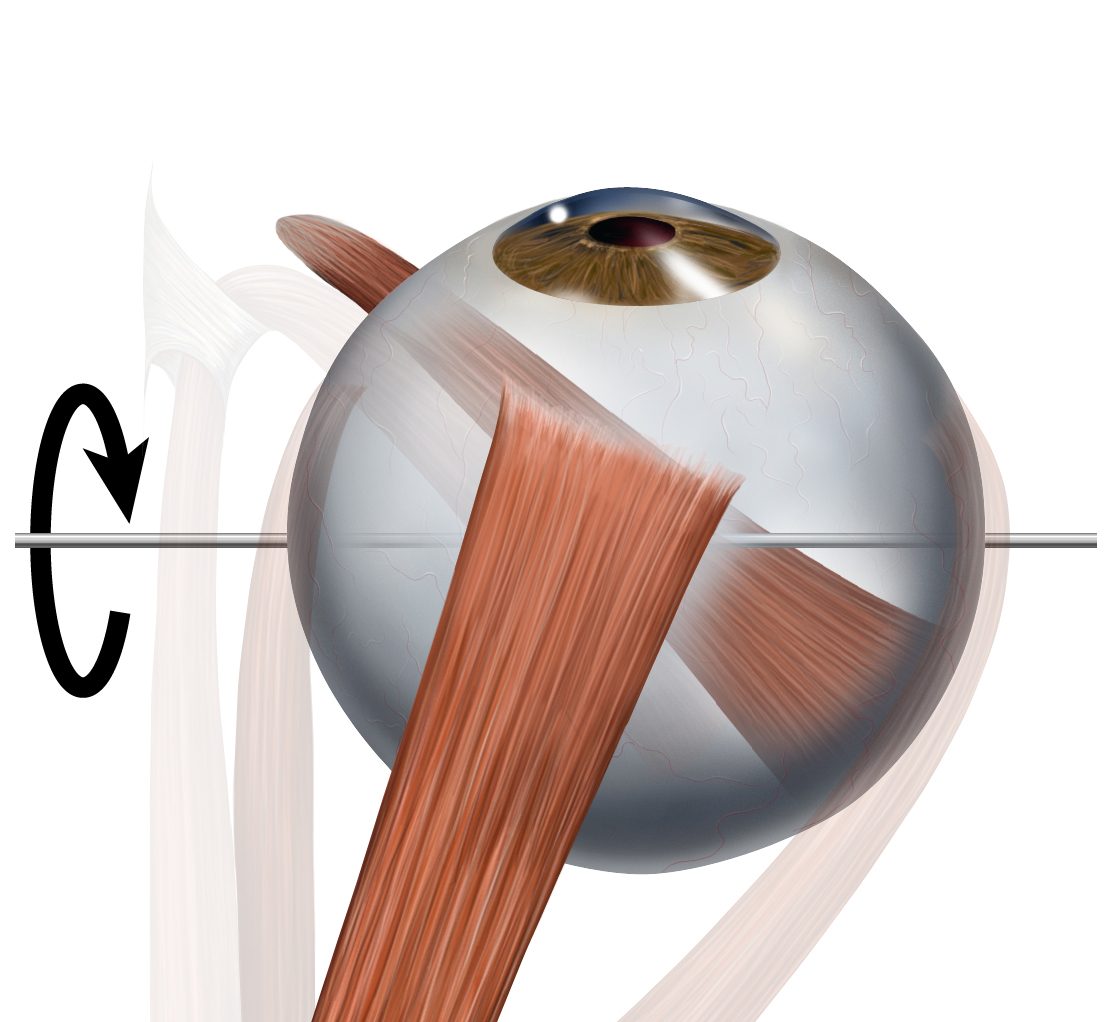
Eye movement of superior rectus muscle, superior view

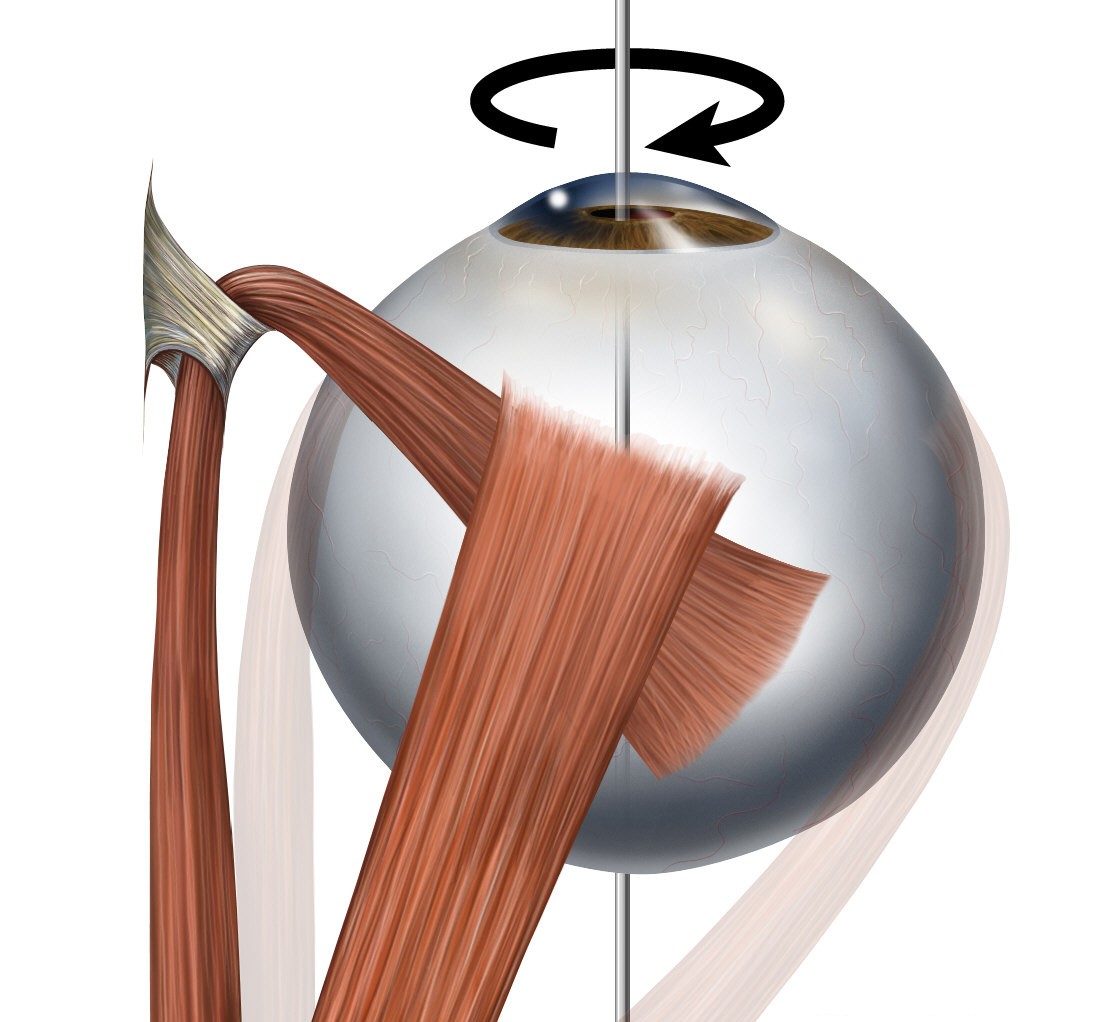
Eye movement of superior oblique muscle, superior view

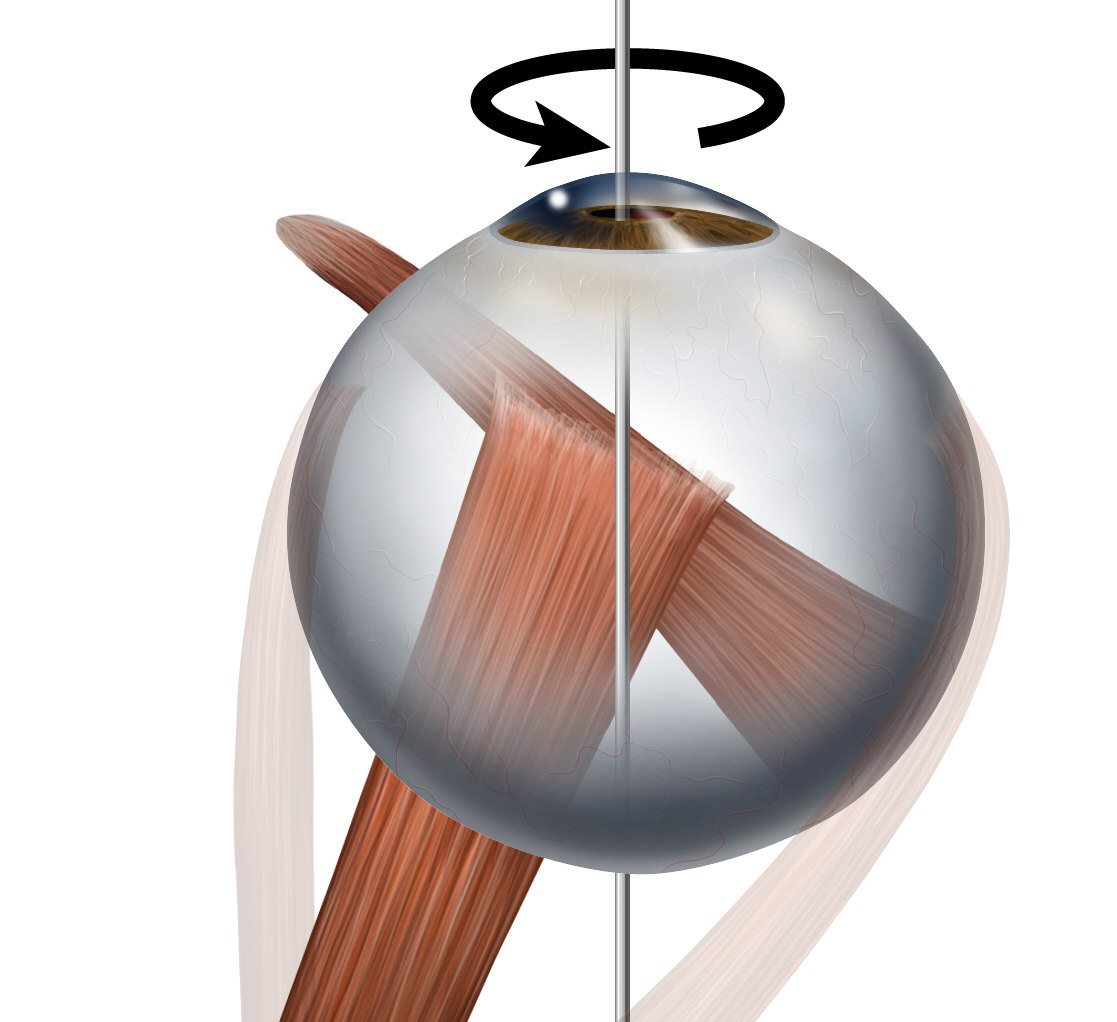
Eye movement of inferior oblique muscle, superior view

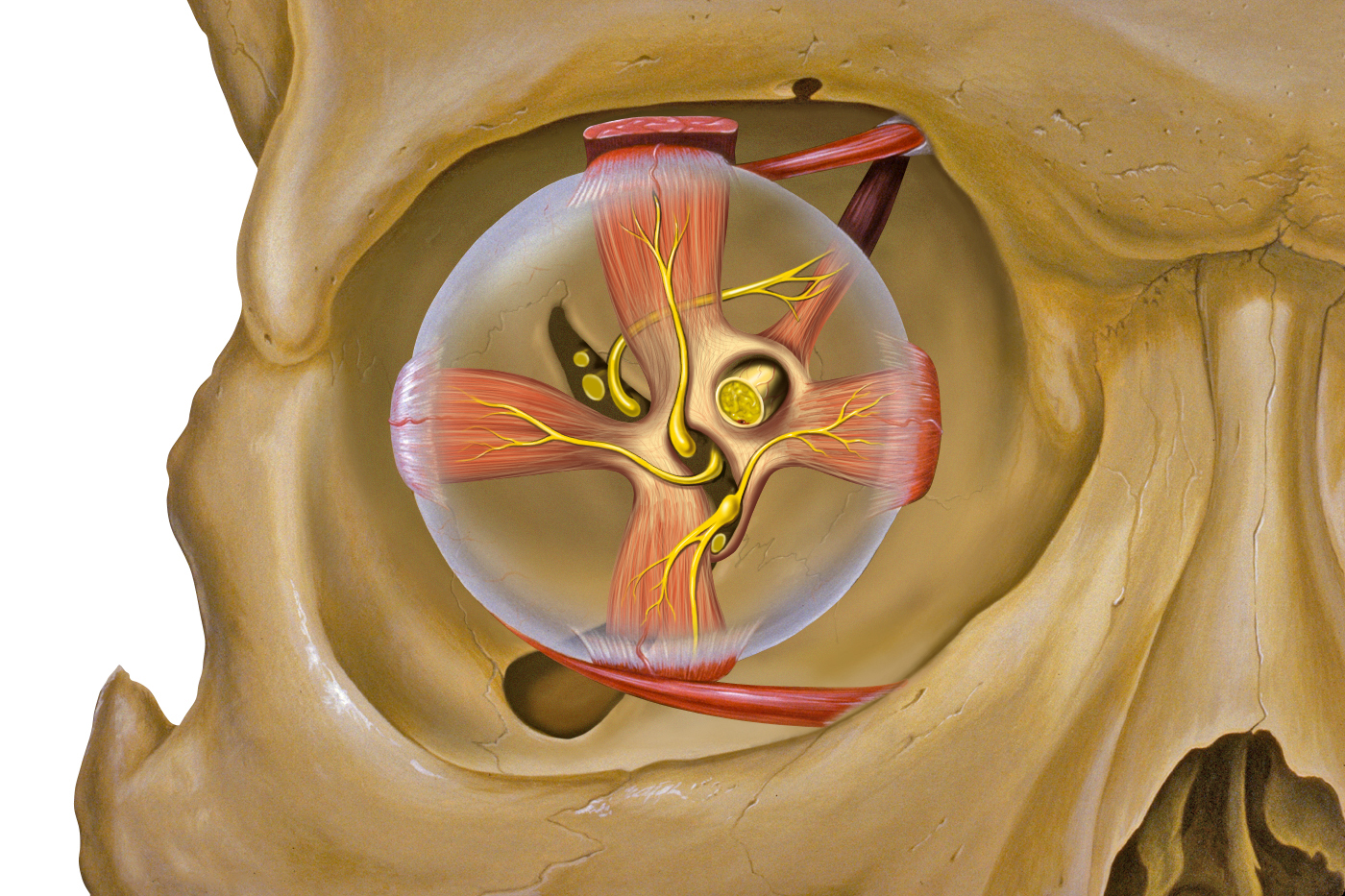
Anterior view
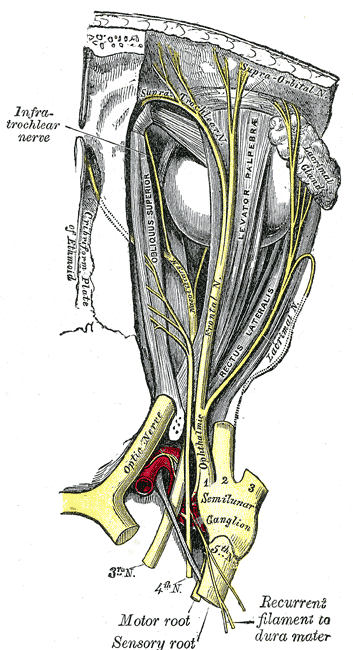
Nerves of the orbit. Seen from above.

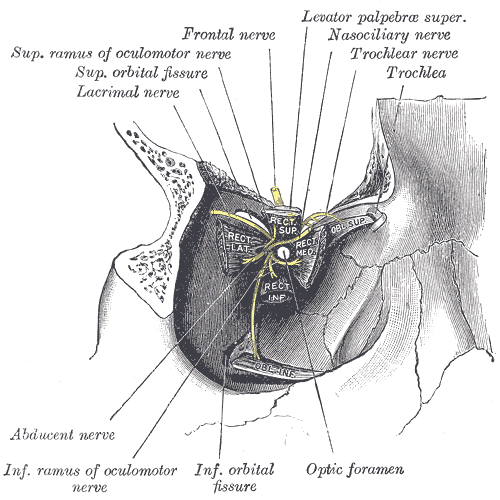
Dissection showing origins of right ocular muscles, and nerves entering by the superior orbital fissure.
