= Leucopogon decussatus =

Scientific classification
- Kingdom: Plantae
- Clade: Tracheophytes
- Clade: Angiosperms
- Clade: Eudicots
- Clade: Asterids
- Order: Ericales
- Family: Ericaceae
- Genus: Leucopogon
- Species: L. decussatus

Binomial name
- Leucopogon decussatus Stschegl.
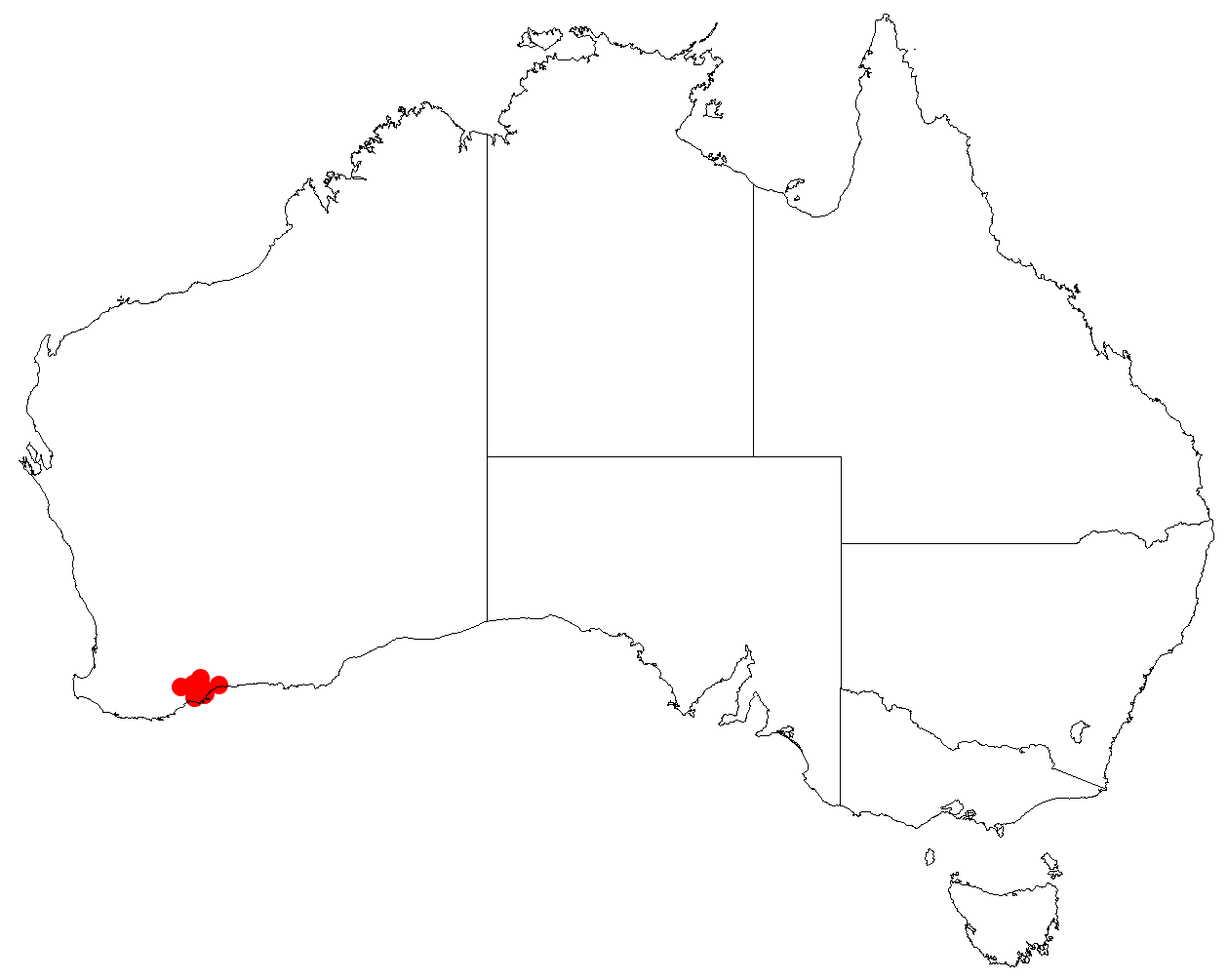
- Occurrence data from AVH

Species of plant

Leucopogon decussatus is a species of flowering plant in the heath family Ericaceae and is endemic to the south-west of Western Australia. It is an erect shrub that typically grows to a height of about 40 cm (16 in). It was first formally described in 1859 by Sergei Sergeyevich Sheglejev in the Bulletin de la Société impériale des naturalistes de Moscou. The specific epithet (decussatus) means "decussate".

It is listed as a synonym of Leucopogon elatior by Plants of the World Online.

Leucopogon decussatus occurs in the Esperance Plains and Mallee bioregions of south-western Western Australia and is listed "not threatened" by the Government of Western Australia Department of Biodiversity, Conservation and Attractions.
