= Fundi =

Fundi can refer to:

== People ==
- Fundi (Billy) Abernathy (1939–2016), American photographer
- Fundi Konde (1924–2000), Kenyan musician and singer
- Fundi Tshazibana (born c. 1977), South African economist and Deputy Governor of the South African Reserve Bank

== Other uses ==
- Fundi (politics), a faction of the Green Party, notably in Germany
- Fondi (Latin name Fundi), a Roman town in Italy
- Fundi, a local African name for the cereal crop Digitaria exilis
- Fundi: The Story of Ella Baker, a 1981 documentary
- Fundi, a member of the Kasakela chimpanzee community in Gombe National Park, Tanzania

== See also ==
- Fundy (disambiguation)
- Fundie, pejorative slang for religious fundamentalists
- Fundus (disambiguation), plural form fundi
