= Phillipine Mtikitiki =

South African corporate executive

- Born: Mbombela, Mpumalanga, South Africa
- Education: University of KwaZulu Natal (Bachelor of Business Administration); Henley Business School South Africa (Master of Business Administration)
- Occupations: Businesswoman and Corporate Executive
- Years active: 1998 — present
- Known for: Leadership
- Title: Vice President of the South African Franchise at Coca Cola International
- Spouse: Zolani Mtikitiki

Phillipine Mtikitiki, is a businesswoman and corporate executive in South Africa, who is the Vice President for the South African franchise of Coca-Cola International, effective 1 January 2021. Before that, from June 2019 until December 2020, she was the regional general manager responsible for the Coca-Cola company's franchise in the East and Central African regions. She was based in Nairobi, Kenya.

== Background and education ==
Phillipine was born in a township near Mbombela, in Mpumalanga Province, South Africa, in the 1970s. At the time of her birth, Mbombela was known as Nelspruit. She attended local schools for her pre-university education. She was then admitted to the University of KwaZulu Natal, where she obtained a Bachelor of Business Administration. Later, she was awarded a Master of Business Administration by Henley Business School South Africa.

== Career ==
In January 1998, she was recruited by the Coca-Cola Company, while at university. The company took her through an intensive management programme. She then worked at different bottling entities in South Africa. Her work roles varied and her responsibilities were gradually increased. During her tenure at Coca-Cola, she completed her Master of Business Administration degree.

Prior to her appointment, Phillipine was the vice president and general manager for the East and Central Africa regions. Before that, from 2017 until 2019, she served as the regional franchise manager of the Coca-Cola Southern and East Africa Business Unit (SEABU), responsible for the countries of Botswana, Mozambique, Namibia, and Zambia. At the South African unit, she replaced Luis Avellar who was appointed president of operations in Latin America. She is based in Johannesburg, in South Africa.

== Family ==
Phillipine Mtikitiki is a married mother of three children, ranging from 18 years to three years of age, as of August 2018.

== See also ==
- Tebogo Mashego
- Nokwanda Mngeni
- Fundi Tshazibana
