= Fundus =

Fundus (Latin for "bottom") is an anatomical term referring to that part of a concavity in any organ, which is at the far end from its opening. It may refer to:

== Anatomy ==
- Fundus (brain), the deepest part of any sulcus of the cerebral cortex
- Fundus (eye), the interior surface of the eye, opposite the lens, and including the retina, optic disc, macula and fovea, and posterior pole
  - Fundus camera, equipment for photographing the interior of the eye
  - Fundus photography
- Fundus (stomach), the portion of the stomach which bulges up past the point of entry of the oesophagus
- Fundus (uterus), the top portion, opposite from the cervix
- Fundus of gallbladder, the portion of the gallbladder which lies the furthest from the cystic duct
- Fundus of the urinary bladder

== Other uses ==
- Fundus (seabed), the seabed in a tidal river below low water mark
