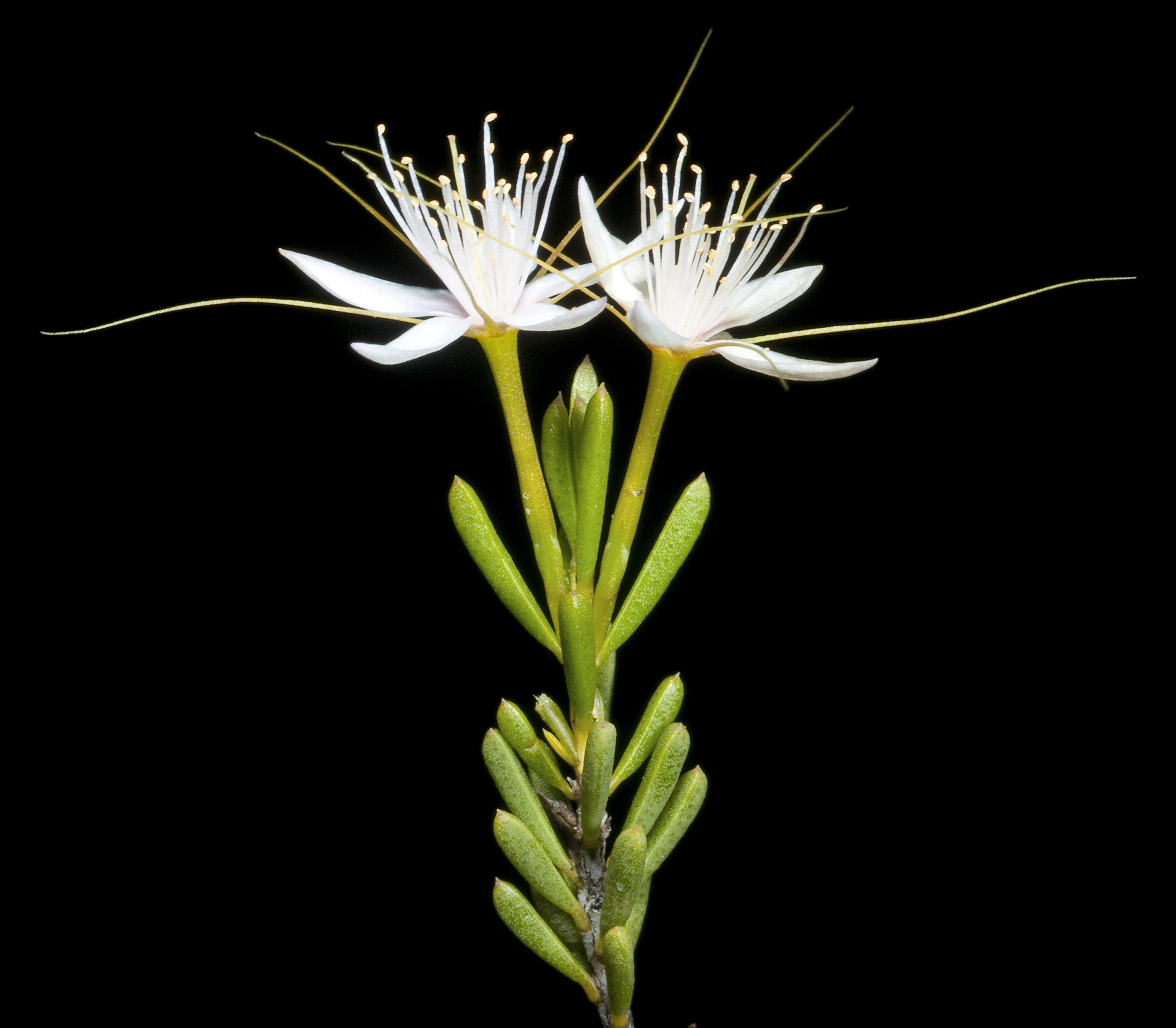

Conservation status
- Priority Three — Poorly Known Taxa (DEC)

Scientific classification
- Kingdom: Plantae
- Clade: Tracheophytes
- Clade: Angiosperms
- Clade: Eudicots
- Clade: Rosids
- Order: Myrtales
- Family: Myrtaceae
- Genus: Calytrix
- Species: C. praecipua

Binomial name
- Calytrix praecipua Craven

= Calytrix praecipua =

Species of flowering plant

Calytrix praecipua is a species of flowering plant in the myrtle family Myrtaceae and is endemic to inland areas of Western Australia. It is a shrub with decussate leaves and pink to pinkish-white flowers with about 21 to 27 stamens in a single row.

== Description ==
Calytrix praecipua is a glabrous shrub that typically grows to a height of 30–70 cm (12–28 in). Its leaves are decussate, lance-shaped with the narrower end towards the base, 2–8 mm (0.079–0.315 in) long and 0.8–1.2 mm (0.031–0.047 in) wide on a petiole 0.3–1 mm (0.012–0.039 in) long with stipules up to 0.25 mm (0.0098 in) long at the base. The flowers are borne on a narrowly funnel-shaped peduncle 5.5–6.0 mm (0.22–0.24 in) long with elliptic lobes 2.5–3.0 mm (0.098–0.118 in) long. The floral tube is 9.5–10 mm (0.37–0.39 in) long and spindle-shaped with ten ribs. The sepals are more or less round to egg-shaped, 1.5–1.7 mm (0.059–0.067 in) long and 1.5–1.8 mm (0.059–0.071 in) wide with an awn up to 14 mm (0.55 in) long. The petals are pink to pinkish-white, lance-shaped to narrowly elliptic, 6.5–8 mm (0.26–0.31 in) long and 1.75–2.4 mm (0.069–0.094 in) wide, and there are about 21 to 27 stamens in a single row. Flowering occurs in June.

== Taxonomy ==
Calytrix praecipua was first formally described in 1987 by Lyndley Craven in the journal Brunonia from specimens he collected 30 km (19 mi) east of Laverton. The specific epithet (praecipua) means 'especial' or 'extraordinary', referring to the "significance of this species in interpreting the evolution of the gynoecium in Calytrix".

== Distribution and habitat ==
This species of Calytrix grows on breakaways and among outcrops in a scattered area around Laverton in the Gascoyne, Great Victoria Desert, Little Sandy Desert and Murchison bioregions of inland Western Australia.

== Conservation status ==
Calytrix praecipua is listed as "Priority Three" by the Government of Western Australia Department of Biodiversity, Conservation and Attractions, meaning that it is poorly known and known from only a few locations but is not under imminent threat.
