= Anatomical terms of neuroanatomy =

Terminology used to describe the central and peripheral nervous systems

This article describes anatomical terminology that is used to describe the central and peripheral nervous systems - including the brain, brainstem, spinal cord, and nerves.

== Anatomical terminology in neuroanatomy ==
Neuroanatomy, like other aspects of anatomy, uses specific terminology to describe anatomical structures. This terminology helps ensure that a structure is described accurately, with minimal ambiguity. Terms also help ensure that structures are described consistently, depending on their structure or function. Terms are often derived from Latin and Greek, and like other areas of anatomy are generally standardised based on internationally accepted lexicons such as Terminologia Anatomica.

To help with consistency, humans and other species are assumed when described to be in standard anatomical position, with the body standing erect and facing observer, arms at sides, palms forward.

=== Location ===
Anatomical terms of location depend on the location and species that is being described.

To understand the terms used for anatomical localisation, consider an animal with a straight CNS, such as a fish or lizard. In such animals the terms "rostral", "caudal", "ventral" and "dorsal" mean respectively towards the rostrum, towards the tail, towards the belly and towards the back. For a full discussion of those terms, see anatomical terms of location.

For many purposes of anatomical description, positions and directions are relative to the standard anatomical planes and axes. Such reference to the anatomical planes and axes is called the stereotactic approach.

Standard terms used throughout anatomy include anterior / posterior for the front and back of a structure, superior / inferior for above and below, medial / lateral for structures close to and away from the midline respectively, and proximal / distal for structures close to and far away from a set point.

Some terms are used more commonly in neuroanatomy, particularly:

- Rostral and caudal: In animals with linear nervous systems, the term rostral (from the Latin rostrum, meaning "beak") is synonymous with anterior and the term caudal (from the Latin cauda, meaning "tail") is synonymous with posterior. Due to humans having an upright posture, however, our nervous system is considered to bend about 90°. This is considered to occur at the junction of the midbrain and diencephalon (the midbrain-diencephalic junction). Thus, the terminology changes at either side of the midbrain-diencephalic junction. Superior to the junction, the terminology is the same as in animals with linear nervous systems; rostral is synonymous with anterior and caudal is synonymous with posterior. Inferior to the midbrain-diencephalic junction the term rostral is synonymous with superior and caudal is synonymous with inferior.
- Dorsal and ventral: In animals with linear nervous systems, the term dorsal (from the Latin dorsum, meaning "back") is synonymous with superior and the term ventral (from the Latin venter, meaning "belly") is synonymous with inferior. In humans, however, the terminology differs on either side of the midbrain-diencephalic junction. Superior to the junction, the terminology is the same as in animals with linear nervous systems; dorsal is synonymous with superior and ventral is synonymous with inferior. However, inferior to the midbrain-diencephalic junction the term dorsal is synonymous with posterior and ventral is synonymous with anterior.
- Contralateral and ipsilateral referring to a corresponding position on the opposite left or right side (the sagittal plane) and on the same side (ipsilateral) respectively.

=== Planes and axes ===
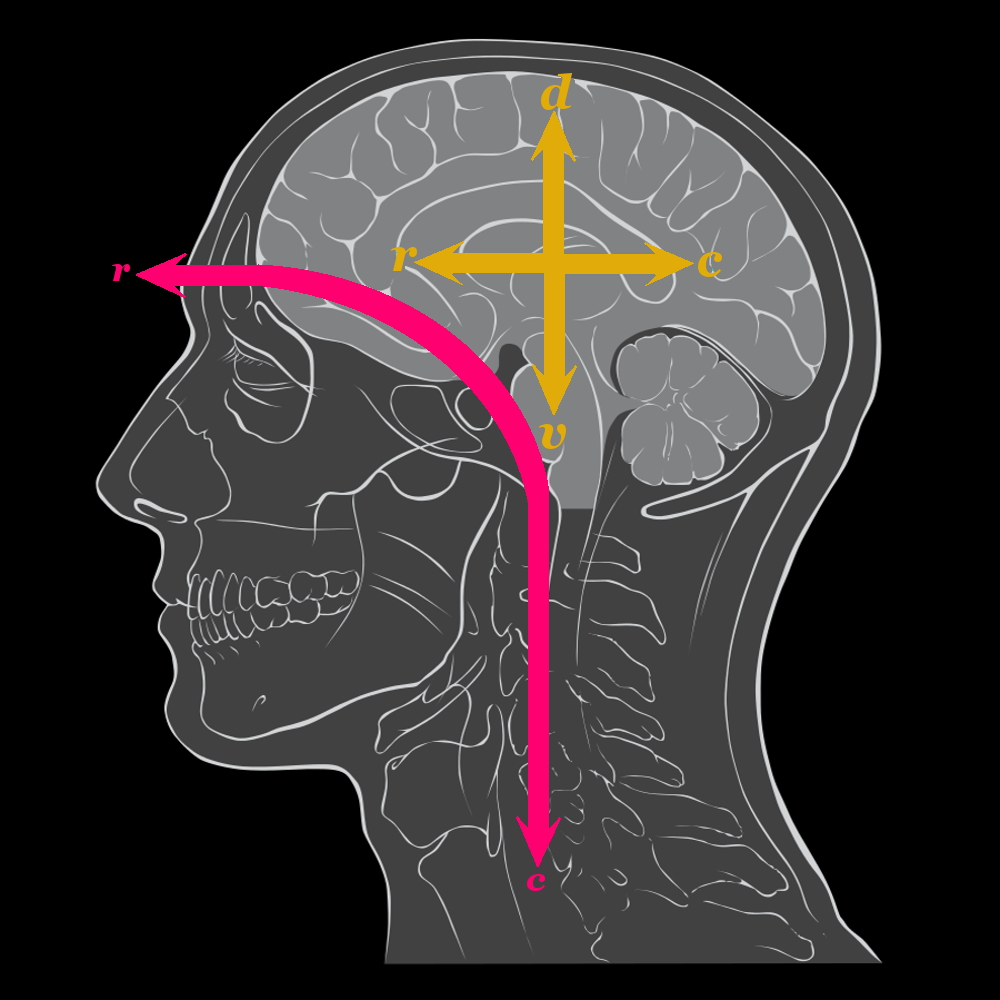
The anatomical axes of orientation of the human brain are at odds with the anatomical axes of the human body in the standard anatomical position. Red axis shows how the head bent forward as the back pointed upwards: c: Caudal r: Rostral Yellow axes show the conventions for naming directions in the brain itself: c: Caudal (though not tail direction), d: Dorsal r: Rostral (effectively unchanged) v: Ventral (though not belly direction)

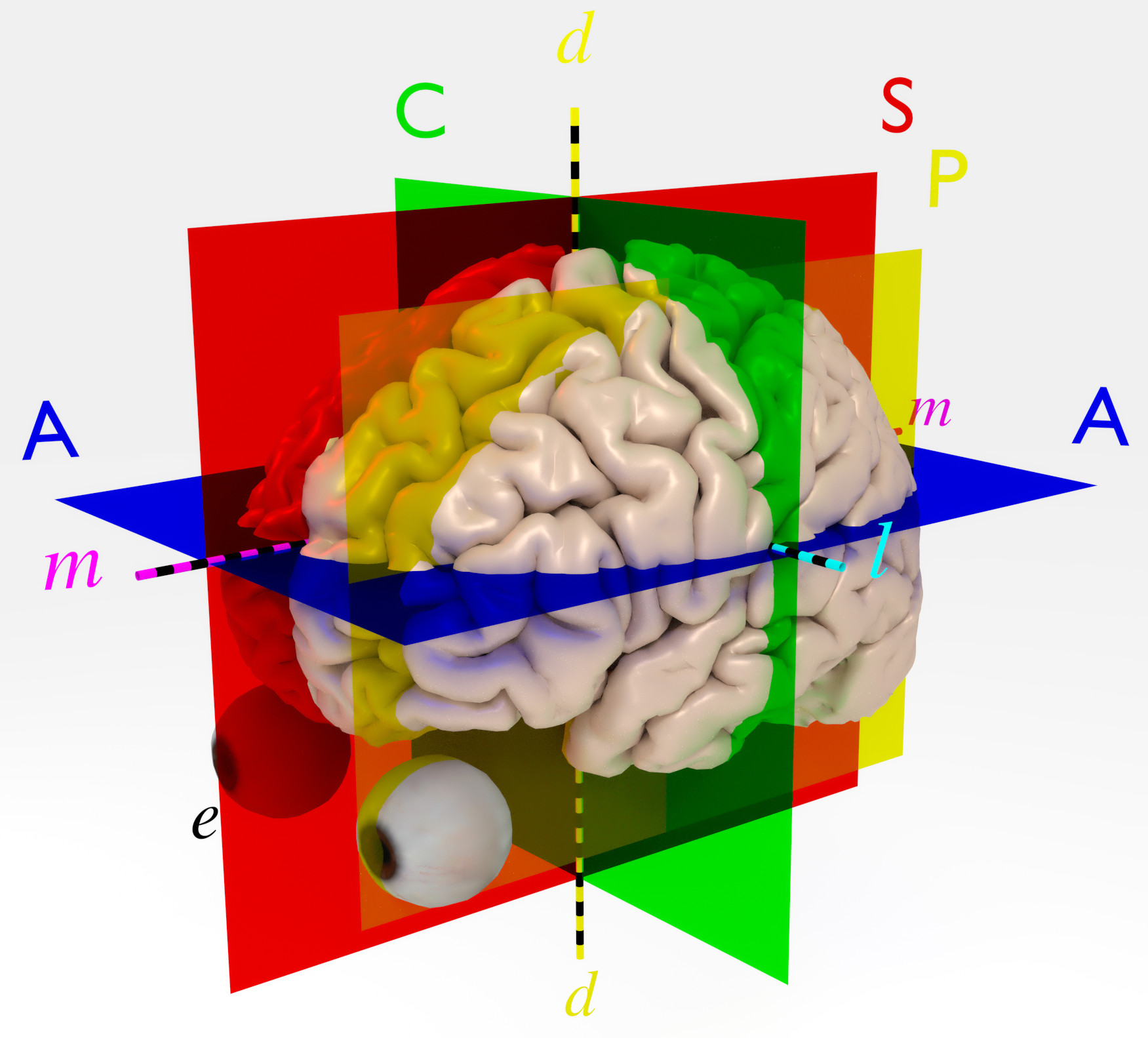
Anatomical axes, planes and localisations in the human brain. Three axes: d: Axial, Superior-inferior or Dorsoventral axis (yellow); l: Left-right, or Lateral axis (cyan, blue-green); m: Median, Antero-posterior or Rostral-to-caudal axis (magenta); Three major planes: A: Axial (blue), containing the lateral axis and also the Medial axis; C: Coronal plane (green), containing the axial axis and the lateral axis; S: Sagittal plane (red), containing the axial axis and the medial axis; Also: e: The eye at the anterior end of the brain; P: A Parasagittal plane (yellow) through one eye; parasagittal planes comprise the class of planes parallel to (and therefore lateral to) the sagittal plane.

Standard anatomical planes and anatomical axes are used to describe structures in animals. In humans and many other primates the axis of the central nervous system is not straight, but bent to allow for forward vision when the body is vertical. This means that differences in terminology are needed to reflect the differences between the brains of primates and the brains of nearly all other vertebrates. For example, to describe the human brain, "rostral" still means "towards the beak or snout (Latin rostrum)", or at any rate, the interior of the cranial cavity just behind the face. "Caudal" means "towards the tail (Latin cauda"), but not "towards the back of the cranial cavity", which is "posterior" (behind, in ordinary motion). The rostro-caudal axis of the human central nervous system (magenta in the diagram) makes a near 90° bend at the level of the midbrain and continues through the brain-stem and spinal cord. In human anatomy, the occipital lobes and the back of the head are posterior but not caudal to the frontal lobes and the face.

"Superior" and "inferior" are adjectives from human anatomy, respectively meaning towards to top of the head or the soles of the feet when standing. The brain is superior to the spinal cord in people, but in quadrupeds the brain is anterior (forward in motion) to the spinal cord.

"Dorsal" means "in the direction away from the ridge of the human back or its equivalent in other animals. In human neuroanatomy the word is somewhat distorted, becoming synonymous with "superior" in the forebrain, i.e. in the direction of the roof of the cranial cavity"cranial cavity and thence to the body. "Ventral" in the central nervous system also refers to the rostro-caudal axis, which changes within the head.

These three axes of the human brain match the three planes within which they lie, even though the terms for the planes have not been changed from the terms for the bodily planes. The most commonly used reference planes are:

- Axial or "transverse" or "horizontal", the plane that is horizontal and parallel to the ground with the body standing in the standard anatomical position. It contains (and thus is defined by) the lateral and the medial axes of the brain.
- Coronal, a vertical plane that passes through the coronal suture of the skull (or through both ears), or any plane parallel to this. There is no term "paracoronal" comparable to the commonly used "parasagittal".
- Sagittal, a vertical plane that passes from between the nostrils, and between the cerebral hemispheres, dividing the brain into left and right halves. "Median plane" specifically defines the midline between left and right sides of the body. It contains the dorsoventral and medial axes of the brain. A parasagittal plane is any plane parallel to the sagittal plane.

== Nerves ==
=== Function ===
Specific terms are used for peripheral nerves that originate from, or arrive at, a specific point.

An afferent nerve fiber is a fibre originating at the present point. For example, a striatal afferent is an afferent originating at the striatum.

An efferent nerve fiber is one that arrives at the present point. For example, a cortical efferent is a fibre coming from elsewhere, and arriving to the cortex. That is the opposite of the direction in which the nerve fibre conducts signals.

=== Nerve fibre crossings ===
Specific terms are also used to describe the route of a nerve or nerve fibre:

A chiasm (from Greek Chi) is used to describe different types of crossings of or within peripheral nerve fibres between the cerebral hemispheres. The major example in the human brain is the Optic chiasm.

A decussation (from Latin decussis 'ten', written as a capital X) refers to nerve fibers that cross the sagittal plane from one side of the central nervous system to the other, and connect different brain regions. There are two kinds:

- Type 1 crosses the sagittal plane in the same brain region or spinal segment where the cell body is located. Examples are Mauthner cells in fish and amphibians.
- Type 2 crosses the sagittal plane in a different brain region. Example: pyramidal decussations.

The first type is known also for invertebrates, whereas the second type only occurs in vertebrates. The second type is thought to be due to an axial twist, such that each hemisphere of the forebrain represents predominantly the contralateral side of the body.

A commissure is a bilateral connection of axons connecting the left and right side of the same brain region. For example, nerve fibre tracts that cross between the two cerebral hemispheres, are the anterior commissure, posterior commissure, corpus callosum, hippocampal commissure, and habenular commissure. The spinal cord contains a commissure as well: the anterior white commissure.

A ganglion can also have the form of crossing nerves, but a ganglion always contains synapses between neurons as well as their cell bodies. The other kinds of nerve crossings never contain synapses of cell bodies of neurons.

The difference between a chiasm and a decussation is that the first refers to peripheral nerves whereas the latter refers to crossings inside central nervous system. A commissure connects the same brain region of each side whereas a decussation connects different brain regions.

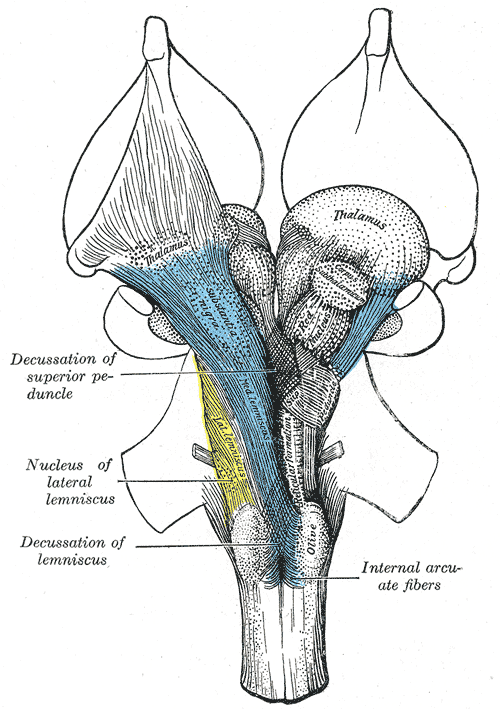
The brainstem from the front, showing a decussation of the superior pedicle and lemniscus, where nerve fibres from one side cross over to the next

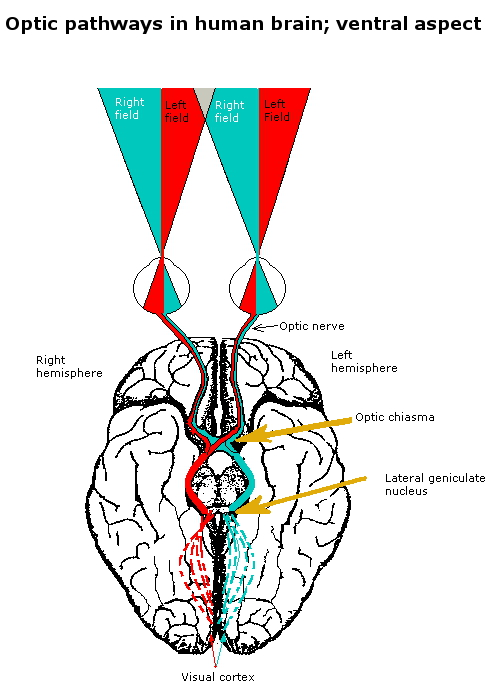
The optic chiasm in the human brain, showing pathways conveying information from the visual field of each eye to the contralateral visual cortex

== Brain ==
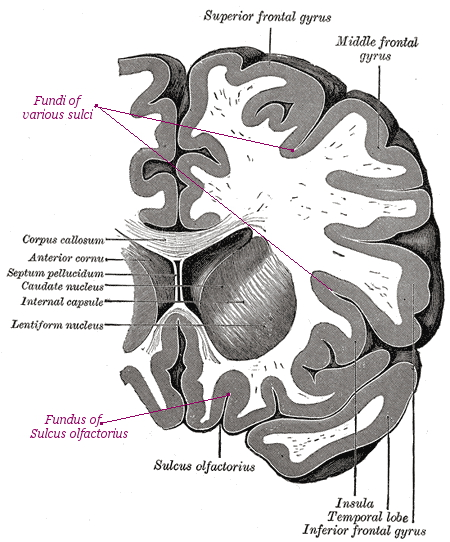
Image of the human brain showing sulci, gyri, and fundi shown in a Coronal section.

Specific terms are used to represent the gross anatomy of the brain:

A gyrus is an outward folding of the brain, for example the precentral gyrus. A sulcus is an inward fold, or valley in the brain's surface - for example the central sulcus. Additional terms used to describe these may include:

- Annectent gyrus, for a small gyrus hidden in the depth of a sulcus
- sulcal fundus, for the bottom of a sulcus, an inward fold

A fissure is used to describe:

1. A deep groove produced by opercularisation. An example is the Sylvian Fissure.
2. A deep groove produced by the differentiation of the telencephalic vesicles. An example is the longitudinal fissure, also known as the interhemispheric fissure.

== Imaging ==
Specific acronyms are used to represent imaging. Some common acronyms include MRI (Magnetic Resonance Imaging) and CT (Computed tomography).

== See also ==
- Anatomical terms of muscle
- Anatomical terms of motion
