= Chiasm (anatomy) =

Nerve crossings outside the central nervous system

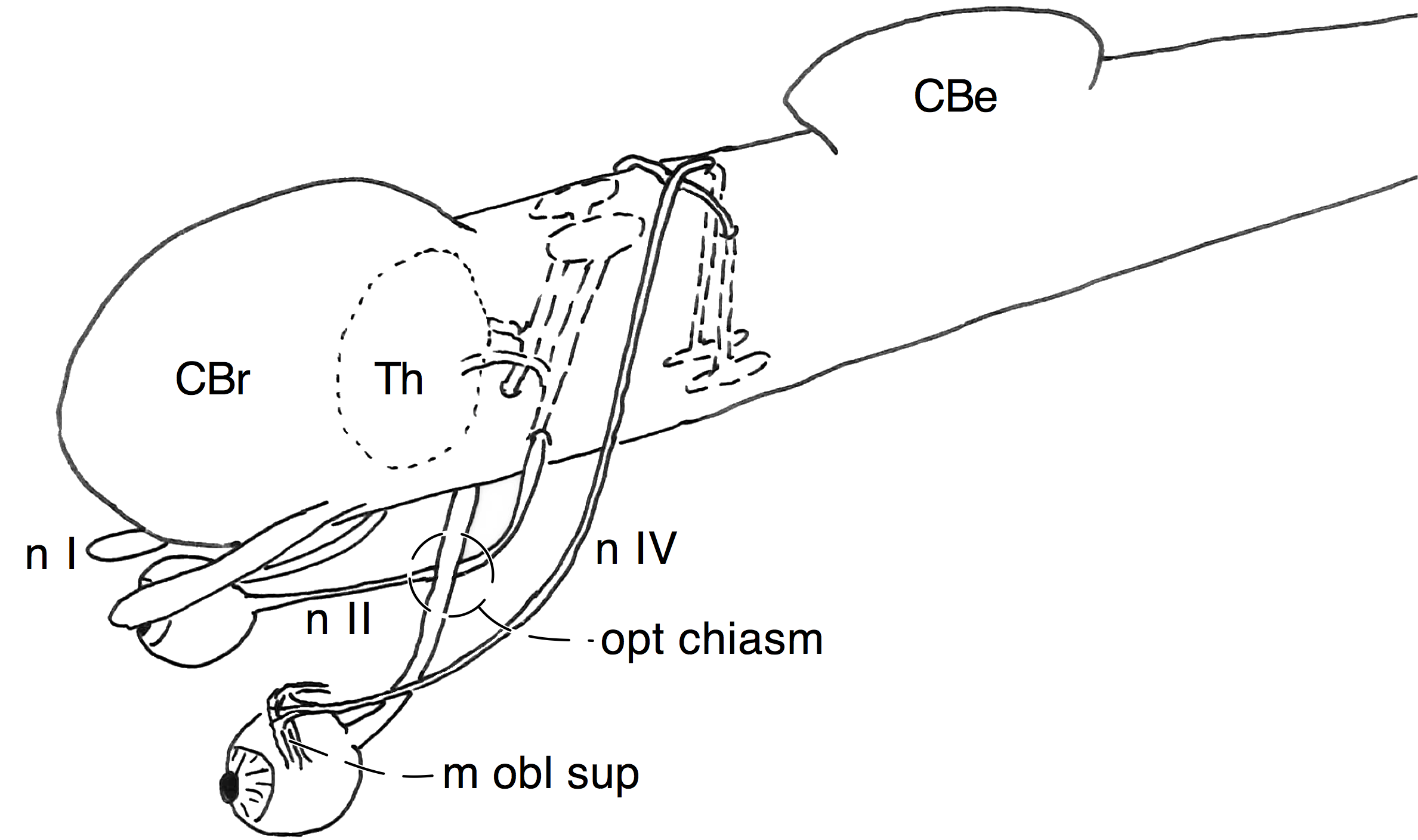
- Schema of the optic chiasm and the trochlear chiasm in vertebrates.

Details
- Function: Anatomical feature where two structures cross

Identifiers
- Latin: chiasma

In anatomy a chiasm is the spot where two structures cross, forming an X-shape (from Greek letter χ, Chi). Examples of chiasms are:

- A tendinous chiasm, the spot where two tendons cross. For example, the tendon of the flexor digitorum superficialis muscle, and the tendon of the flexor digitorum longus muscle which even forms two chiasms.
- In neuroanatomy, the crossing of fibres of a nerve or the crossing of two nerves.

== Neural chiasms ==
Different types of crossings of nerves are referred to as chiasm:

- Type I: Two nerves can cross one over the other (sagittal plane) without fusing, e.g., the trochlear nerve (see figure).
- Type II: Two nerves can merge while at least part of the fibres cross the midline (see figure 2).
- Type III: The fibres within a single nerve cross, such that the order of the functional map is reversed, e.g., the optic chiasms of various invertebrates such as insects and cephalopods.
- Type IV: A torsion or loop by 180 degrees of a nerve can also reverse the order of the functional map. This type is usually not referred to as chiasm.

Note that in the third type there is no crossing of the mid sagittal plane. Only in the first type, the crossing is complete.

There are other kinds of crossings of nerve fibres. The chiasm is distinguished from a decussation, which is a crossing of nerve fibres inside the central nervous system. A chiasm also differs from a ganglion in that axons run through it without making any synapses. A chiasm is thus not a nervous processing centre.

== Optic chiasm in vertebrates ==
By far the most widely known chiasm is the optic chiasm in vertebrate animals, including humans.

== Examples ==
Chiasms are found in vertebrates but also in invertebrates. The optic chiasm in vertebrates can be of type I or II. However, an optic chiasm of type III is found in many insects and in cephalopods.

In vertebrates, three of the cranial nerves show a chiasm.

- The optic chiasm of the optic tract (type I or II)
- The chiasm of the Trochlear nerve (type I)
- The decussation of part of the Oculomotor nerve (type I)

The optic chiasm of vertebrates involves the optic tract. The trochlear nerve is a motor nerve that innervates one of the muscles that move the contralateral eye (i.e., the superior oblique muscle). It emerges from the dorsal aspect of the ventral midbrain, leaves the brain on the dorsal side where it crosses to the opposite side. The oculomotor nerve originates from the third nerve nucleus at the level of the superior colliculus (in non-mammalian vertebrates this is the optic tectum) in the midbrain. The rostral part of the nerve crosses the midline to merge with the part of the contralateral nerve that does not cross. Since the midline crossing occurs inside the brain, it is not strictly a chiasm but rather a decussation.

== Structure ==
As stated above, very different kinds of nerve crossings are known as chiasm. The optic chiasm of vertebrates is the best known. The optic nerve runs from the retina towards the ventral midline of the brain and crosses to the opposite side to continue as the optic tract which inserts to the optic tectum (=superior colliculus) on the dorsal midbrain (as well as branching off to the thalamus in amniotes).

=== Type I: Passing in the sagittal plane ===
In many vertebrates, the left-eye optic nerve crosses over the right-eye one, without blending.

=== Type II: Fusion in the sagittal plane ===
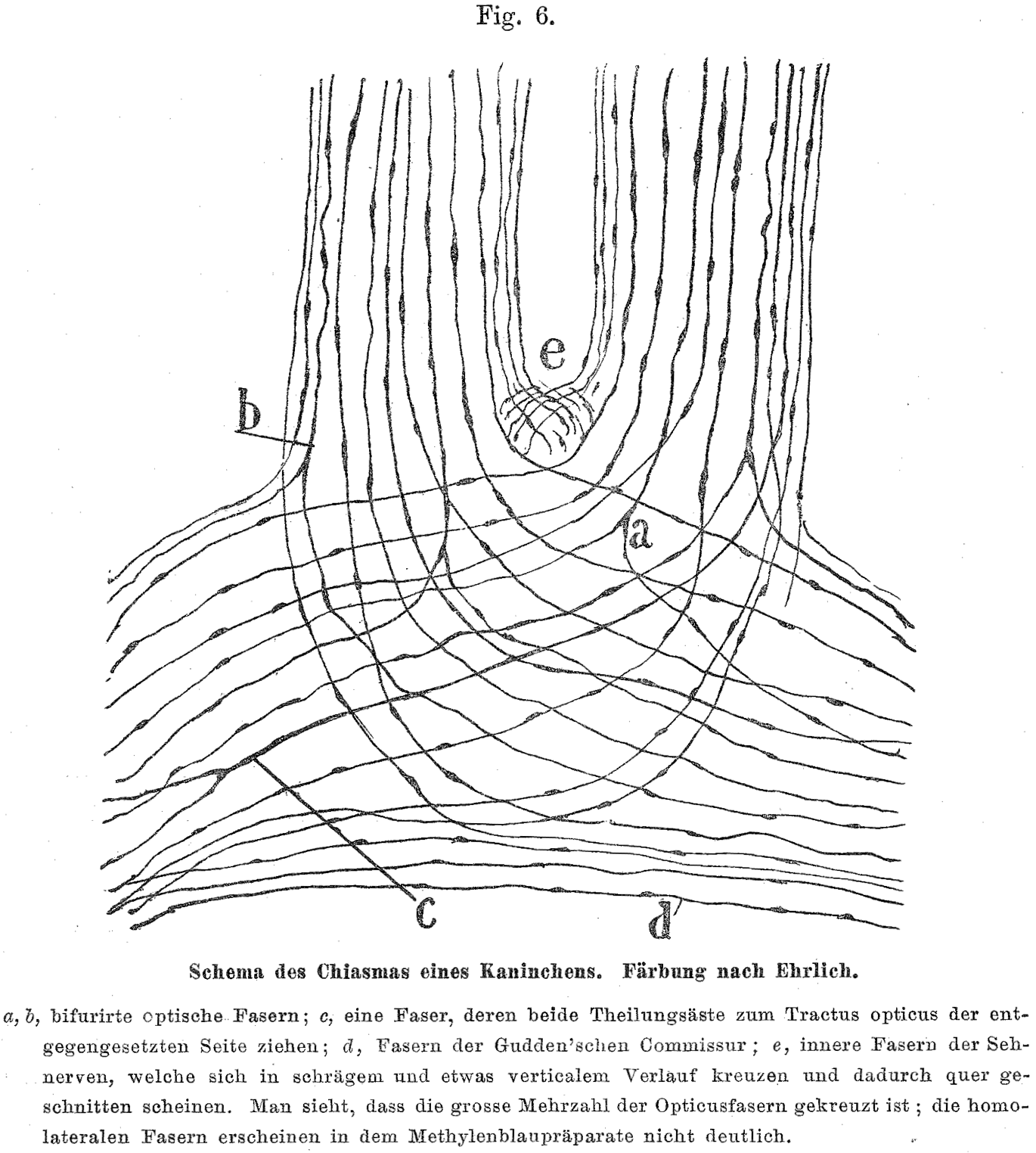
Figure 2. Example of bifurcating axons in the optic chiasm (Type II) of a rabbit. a,b,c: bifurcating optic fibres. c: fibre bifurcating in the two opposite optic tracts. d. Commissure of Gudden. e. Fibres that continue in a different depth. (from: Cajal, Fig. 6)

In mammals and birds and other vertebrates with frontal eyes, the optic nerves do blend in the optic chiasm, and only part of the nerve fibres cross the midline. The drawings of Cajal suggest that the axons of the optic nerve may branch in the optic chiasm, and thus give off a branch both in the ipsi- and contralateral optic tract. Note, however, that such branching is not neural processing as occurs in a ganglion.

=== Type III: Systematic crossing of fibres inside a nerve ===
The optic tract of various clades of insects shows two chiasms, the first and second optic chiasm. In contrast to those in vertebrates, the insect chiasms do not cross the body midline. Rather, the first and second chiasm invert the anterior and posterior visual field. Since there are two chiasms, the retinotopic map is not affected.

Cephalopods (squids and octopuses) possess highly developed lens eyes. The optic tract of cephalopods, such as the squid Loligo, chiasmates without midline crossing. This chiasm is distributed along the optic tract and effectively compensates the inversion of the image on the retina.

=== Type IV: Torsion or looping of a nerve ===
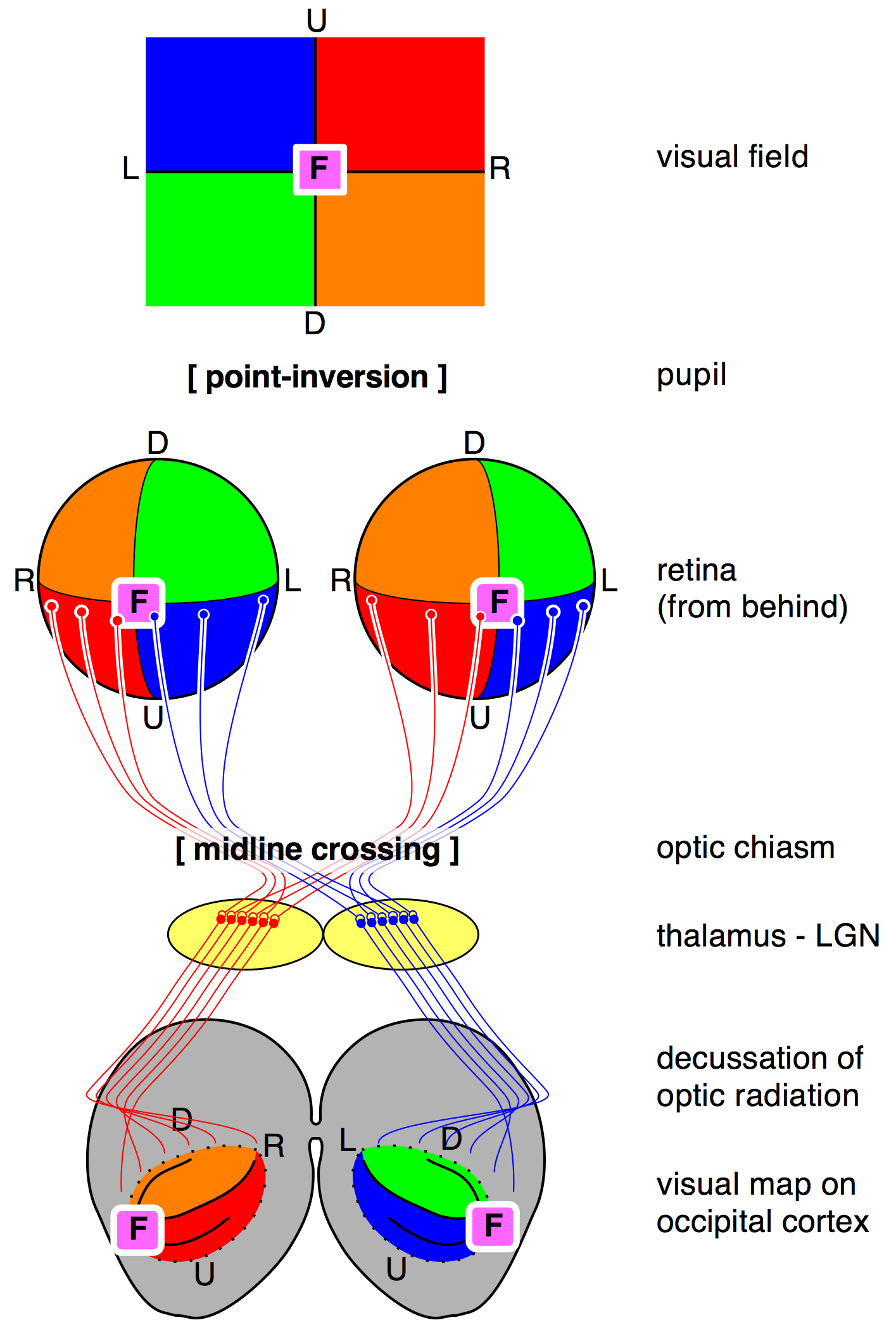
Figure 3. The decussation of the optic radiation in the cortex is an example of a type IV crossing

This type is usually not called chiasm. Such a looping occurs, for example, in the optic tract between the optic chiasm and the optic tectum. Another example is the optic radiation which rotates the retinal map on the visual cortex by 180° (see Figure 3).

== Theories and evolution ==
=== Vertebrates ===
A number of theories have been proposed to explain the existence of the optic chiasm in vertebrates. The first is these theories was the Visual map theory by Ramón y Cajal. The Axial twist theory also explains the chiasm of the trochlear nerve. The hypothesis of Cajal might be valid for the optic chiasm of cephalopods, although in a different manner, because Cajal designed his idea for a chiasm of type II but the cephalopod chiasm is of type III.

=== invertebrates ===
The lens eye inverts the visual image that is projected on the retina due to the camera obscura effect. The chiasm in the optic tract of cephalopods corrects this inversion.

In insects, the optic chiasms seem to have evolved gradually, since primitive groups have no chiasm, whereas later evolved groups have one or two optic chiasms along the optic lobe.

== Exceptions ==
In jawless vertebrates (hagfish and lamprey), the optic tracts do cross in the midline, but only after entering the ventral side of the central nervous system. After crossing the tracts insert on the dorsal optic tectum as in all other vertebrates. Therefore, given the obvious and undisputed homology, the optic chiasm is called chiasm also in these clades, even though the crossing is technically a decussation.

== See also ==
- Definition of types of crossings
- Contralateral brain
- Optic chiasm
- Chiasmal syndromes
- Insect morphology
- Chiasmatic groove
