= Fundy =

Fundy may refer to:

== Places in Canada ==
- Bay of Fundy, an Atlantic Canadian bay home to the highest tides in the world
- Fundy National Park, on the Bay of Fundy
- Fundy Biosphere Reserve, a UNESCO biosphere reserve designated in 2007

== People ==
- DJ LeMahieu, also known as "Big Fundy".
- Fundy, a Dutch Twitch streamer and YouTuber who was part of the Dream SMP.

== Other ==
- Fundy-class minesweeper, a Canadian class of minesweeper during the Second World War.
  - HMCS Fundy (J88), the lead ship in the class.

== See also ==
- Fundi (disambiguation)
