= Tebogo Mashego =

South African entrepreneur and industrialist

- Born: 1982 (age 43–44); South Africa
- Citizenship: South Africa
- Occupations: Entrepreneur, industrialist, business executive
- Title: Proprietor and chief executive officer of Projects Proprietary Limited

Tebogo Anna Mashego is a South African entrepreneur and industrialist who is co-founder and chief executive officer of Projects Proprietary Limited, a metal fabrication design and manufacturing company.

== Early life ==
Mashego was born in South Africa in 1982. She attended Sekete IV High School in Rustenburg, North West Province, graduating in 1998.

She later married and began working as a human resources officer at a municipality.

== Career ==
In 2004, Tebogo and her husband established Diep K Steel & Aluminum Proprietary Limited. Tebogo managed the business part-time, while still working as a human resources officer for a local government entity. In 2008, she resigned from her job at the municipality to manage her business full-time. The same year, her husband divested from the company.

In 2014, the company re-branded to Ditsogo Projects Proprietary Limited and relocated to the industrial area of Rustenburg. The company is wholly owned and managed by women. Additional personnel and an upgraded business model were credited with a 20% reduction in operational costs.

Mashego promotes inclusive and sustainable industrialization, building resilient infrastructure and fostering innovation (United Nations Millennium Development Goal 9), with sustainable production and consumption patterns (Sustainable Development Goal 12).

In 2014, Mashego was named among "The 20 Youngest Power Women in Africa 2014" by Forbes.
