= Fundi Tshazibana =

South African economist (born c. 1977)

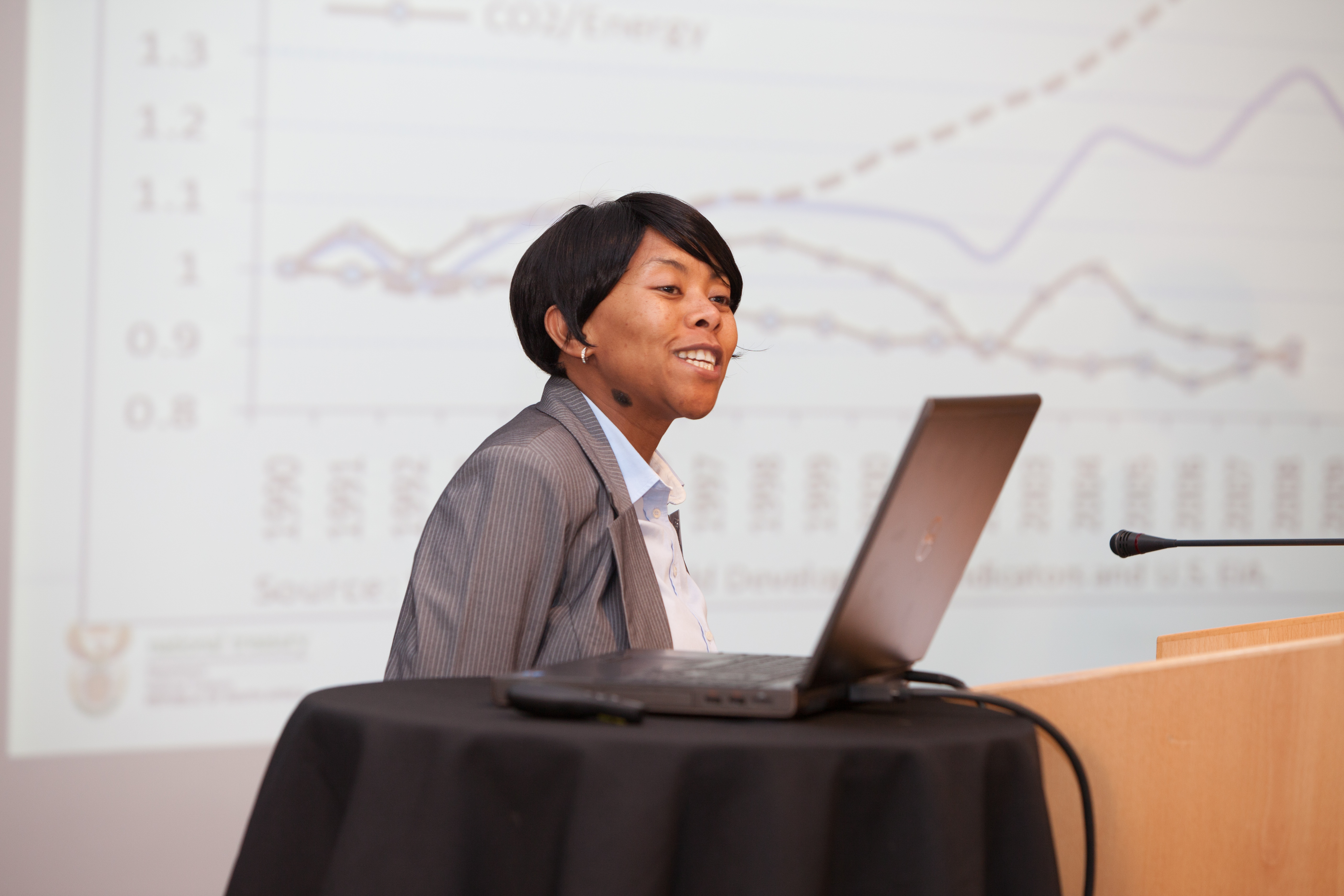
- Fundi Tshazibana, South Africa Economist
- Born: 1977 (age 47–48); South Africa
- Education: University of Natal (Bachelor of Commerce) (Master of Commerce); University of South Africa (Master of Business Leadership)
- Occupation(s): Economist and banker
- Years active: 1995-present
- Title: Deputy Governor of the Reserve Bank of South Africa
- Term: 10 July 2019-present
- Predecessor: None

Nomfundo Tshazibana (born c. 1977), commonly known as Fundi Tshazibana, is a South African economist, who serves Deputy Governor of the South African Reserve Bank from 10 July 2019. Immediately prior to her appointment to that position, she served as an adviser to the Governor of the bank, since 10 February 2018.

Before that, from 2015 until 2018, she served as Alternate Executive Director at the International Monetary Fund, in Washington, DC, for 23 Sub-Saharan African countries, including South Africa.

== Early life and education ==
Tshazibana was born in South Africa circa 1977. She grew up in the town of Benoni, Gauteng, about 40 kilometres (25 mi) by road, east of Johannesburg, the largest city in that country.

She was identified as a gifted student and matriculated at age 15 years. She graduated with her first degree, a Bachelor of Commerce, from the then University of Natal (now University of Kwazulu-Natal), at age 18 years. Her second degree, a Master of Commerce in Economics as also awarded by the University of Natal. Her third degree is a Master of Business Leadership, which was awarded by the University of South Africa.

== Career ==
For two years, beginning in the middle of her pursuit of her second degree, Tshazibana worked as a market research trainee at Kantar TNS, a global market research conglomerate. After resigning from Kantar, she was hired by the National Energy Regulator of South Africa (NERSA), working there as a staff economist for three and one half years.

In 2003, Tshazibana was hired by the South African National Treasury, a component of the South African Ministry of Finance. She spent twelve years there, starting out as the Director of Micro-Economic Policy. At the time she left, in 2015, she was the Director General for Economic Policy Analysis and Forecasting.

She then spent the next three years (2015–2018), at the International Monetary Fund, within the Africa Group 1 Constituency Office, in Washington, DC, United States, where she was the lead analyst of external and financial sectors of South Africa and 22 other sub-Saharan countries.

In 2018, the Reserve Bank of South Africa appointed her as Adviser to the Governor of the Bank, effective 19 February 2018. She was also appointed as a member to the bank's Monetary Policy Committee (MPC).

In January 2019, Tshazibana's came under consideration to replace Deputy Governor Francois Groepe, when his resignation at the end of January 2019 came into effect. She was appointed as one of two Deputy Governors of the South African Reserve Bank, effective 10 July 2019.

Effective 1 April 2022, Tshazibana will rotate from overseeing the Markets and International Cluster to working as the new chief executive officer of the Prudential Authority (PA). This also includes leading the South African Reserve Bank's "Prudential Cluster, which includes the Financial Surveillance Department". She will concurrently continue to serve as Deputy Governor of SARB and a member of the bank's Monetary Policy Committee.

== Personal life ==
Fundi Tshazibana is a married mother of two children.

== See also ==
- Wendy Lucas-Bull
- Maria Ramos
- Philippine Mtikitiki
