= Leucopogon elatior =

Scientific classification
- Kingdom: Plantae
- Clade: Tracheophytes
- Clade: Angiosperms
- Clade: Eudicots
- Clade: Asterids
- Order: Ericales
- Family: Ericaceae
- Genus: Leucopogon
- Species: L. elatior

Binomial name
- Leucopogon elatior Sond.
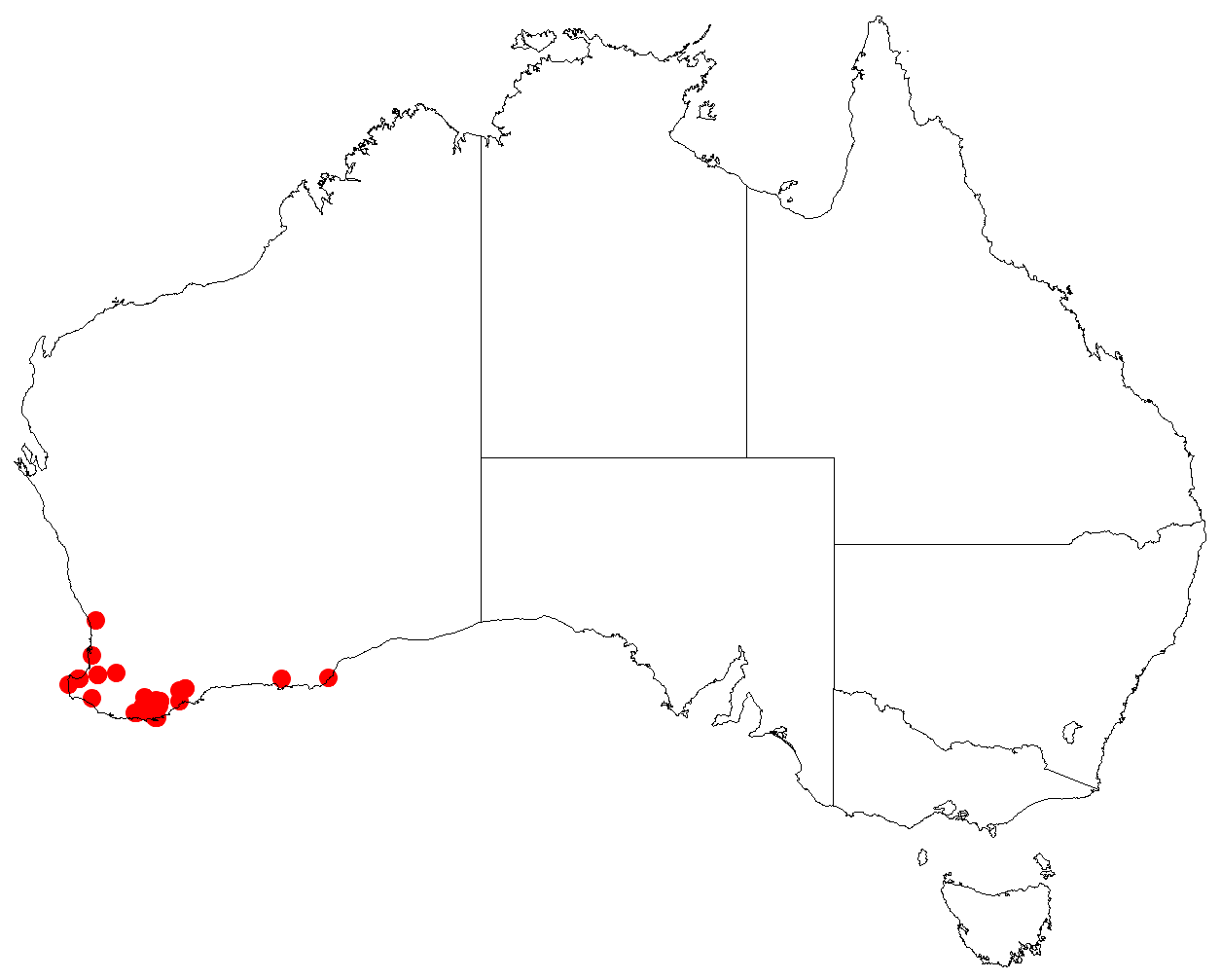
- Occurrence data from AVH

Synonyms
- Leucopogon semioppositus F.Muell. nom. inval., pro syn.; Styphelia elatior (Sond.) Sleumer; Styphelia semiopposita F.Muell.

Species of plant

Leucopogon elatior is a species of flowering plant in the heath family Ericaceae and is endemic to the south-west of Western Australia. It is a slender, erect or straggly shrub with broadly egg-shaped leaves, and white, tube-shaped flowers.

== Description ==
Leucopogon elatior is a slender, erect or straggly shrub that typically grows to a height of 0.2–1 m (7.9 in – 3 ft 3.4 in). Its leaves are broadly egg-shaped to lance-shaped, 2–6 mm (0.079–0.236 in) long with a more or less heart-shaped base. The flowers are arranged in cylindrical spike of many flowers with leaf-like bracts and small bracteoles. The sepals are about 2 mm (0.079 in) long, the petals white and joined at the base to form a broadly bell-shaped tube about 4 mm (0.16 in) long, the lobes longer than the petal tube. Flowering occurs from January to May, or July to November.

== Taxonomy and naming ==
Leucopogon elatior as was first formally described in 1845 by Otto Wilhelm Sonder in Johann Georg Christian Lehmann's Plantae Preissianae. The specific epithet (elatior) means "taller".

== Distribution and habitat ==
This leucopogon grows on sandplains, hillslopes and winter-wet places in the south-west of Western Australia.

== Conservation status ==
Leucopogon elatior is classified as "not threatened" by the Western Australian Government Department of Biodiversity, Conservation and Attractions.
