= Fundus (seabed) =

Seabed in a tidal river below the low-water mark

The fundus is the seabed in a tidal river below low water mark. This can be owned by the foreshore owner (area between high and low water mark) and may require permission and rent, if used for laying a mooring or putting down crab or lobster pots.
