= Decussation =

Biological term to describe a crossing

Decussation is used in biological contexts to describe a crossing (due to the shape of the Roman numeral for ten, an uppercase 'X' (decussis), from Latin decem 'ten' and as 'as'). In Latin anatomical terms, the form decussatio is used, e.g. decussatio pyramidum.

Similarly, the anatomical term chiasma is named after the Greek uppercase 'Χ' (chi). Whereas a decussation refers to a crossing within the central nervous system, various kinds of crossings in the peripheral nervous system are called chiasma.

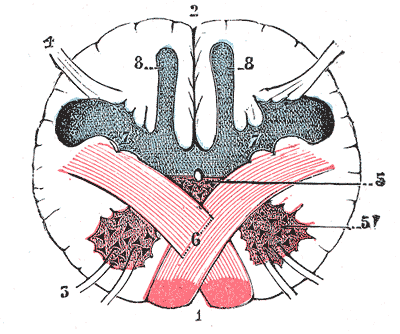
Section of the medulla oblongata at the level of the decussation of the pyramids

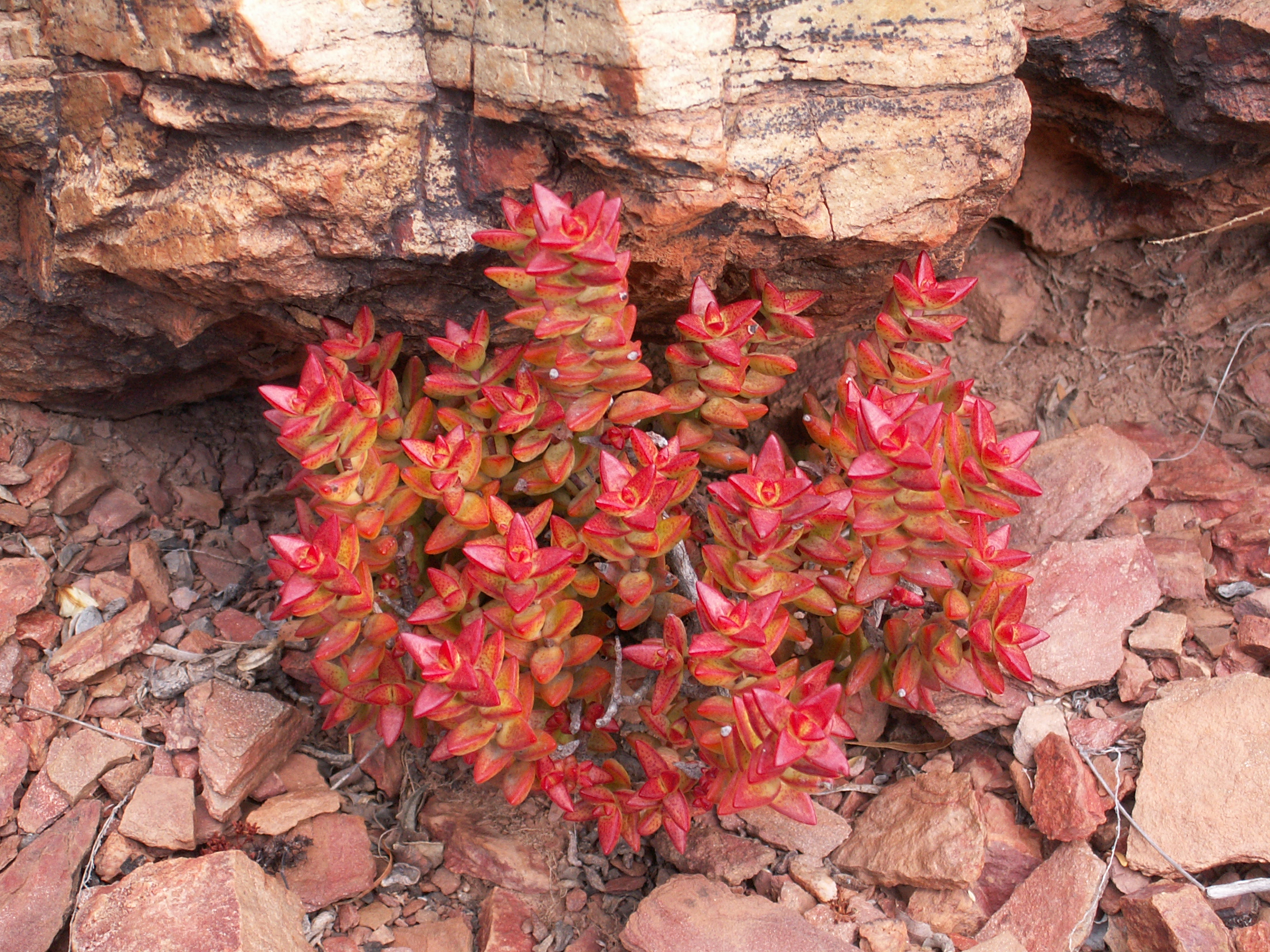
Decussate phyllotaxis of Crassula rupestris

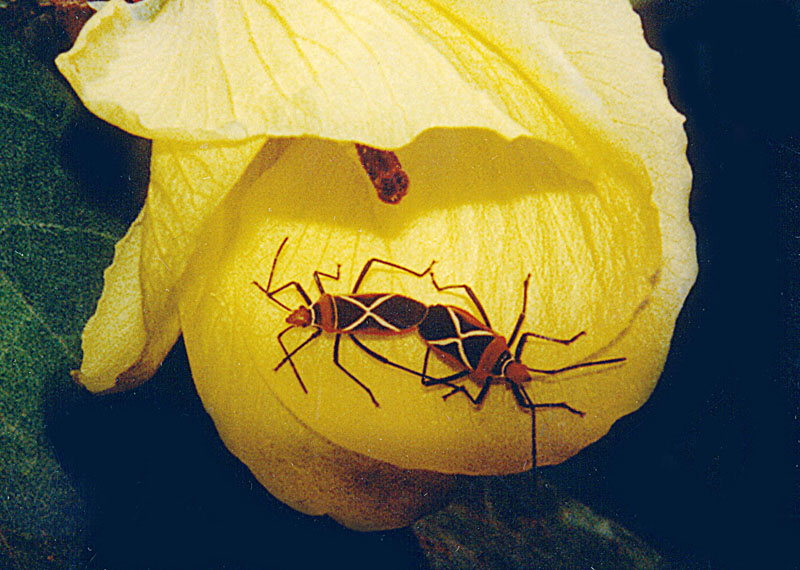
In this "true bug", Dysdercus decussatus, the specific epithet refers to the bandolier-like markings on the back.

Examples include:

- In the brain, where nerve fibers obliquely cross from one lateral side of the brain to the other, that is to say they cross at a level other than their origin. See for examples decussation of pyramids and sensory decussation. In neuroanatomy, the term chiasma is reserved for crossing of- or within nerves such as in the optic chiasm.
- In botanical leaf taxology, the word decussate describes an opposite pattern of leaves which has successive pairs at right angles to each other (i.e. rotated 90 degrees along the stem when viewed from above). In effect, successive pairs of leaves cross each other. Basil is a classic example of a decussate leaf pattern.
- In tooth enamel, where bundles of rods cross each other as they travel from the enamel-dentine junction to the outer enamel surface, or near to it.
- In taxonomic description where decussate markings or structures occur, names such as decussatus or decussata or otherwise in part containing "decuss..." are common, especially in the specific epithet.

== Evolutionary significance ==
The origin of the contralateral organization, the optic chiasm and the major decussations on the nervous system of vertebrates has been a long standing puzzle to scientists. The visual map theory of Ramón y Cajal has long been popular but has been criticized for its logical inconsistence. More recently, it has been proposed that the decussations are caused by an axial twist by which the anterior head, along with the forebrain, is turned by 180° with respect to the rest of the body.

== See also ==
- Chiasm
- Commissure
- Contralateral brain
- Definition of types of crossings
- Fissure (anatomy)
- Palpebral commissure (of the eye)
