= Fundus (brain) =

Deepest part of a sulcus

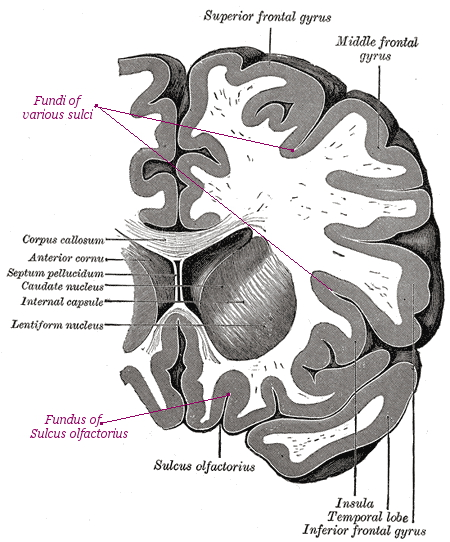
Fundi, sulci, and gyri in a section across a human brain

The deepest part of a sulcus, such as the sulci in the human cerebral cortex.
