= Stereoscopic motion =

Stereoscopic motion, as introduced by Béla Julesz in his book Foundations of Cyclopean Perception of 1971, is a translational motion of figure boundaries defined by changes in binocular disparity over time in a real-life 3D scene, a 3D film or other stereoscopic scene. This translational motion gives rise to a mental representation of three dimensional motion created in the brain on the basis of the binocular motion stimuli. Whereas the motion stimuli as presented to the eyes have a different direction for each eye, the stereoscopic motion is perceived as yet another direction on the basis of the views of both eyes taken together. Stereoscopic motion, as it is perceived by the brain, is also referred to as cyclopean motion, and the processing of visual input that takes place in the visual system relating to stereoscopic motion is called stereoscopic motion processing.

Provided the binocular motion stimuli correspond to a physical object moving in 3D space, the stereoscopic motion closely represents its actual motion. Alternatively, the images with the binocular motion stimuli can be artificially created, for instance using dynamic random dot stereograms.

Cyclopean (stereoscopic) motion and cyclopean images are aspects of so-called cyclopean vision – named after the mythical giant Cyclops who had only one eye – involving a mental representation of objects in space as if they were perceived in full depth and from a position of a "cyclopean eye" situated approximately between the two eyes.

By definition, individuals who have only monocular vision do not perform stereoscopic motion processing. They rely instead on monocular depth cues to perceive motion in space (see also: kinetic depth effect).

== Sensing and processing ==
Stereoscopic motion is sensed in a way that cannot be explained by feature tracking or by inferring the motion from memory of position and time, and it appears to involve specific low-level motion sensing. Purely binocular motion stimuli appear to influence also stereoblind persons as far as their sensation of self-motion is concerned. Using dynamic random dot stereograms presented using a virtual reality head-mounted display, it was demonstrated from subjects' performance on real-world tasks of ball catching and obstacle avoidance that stereoscopic motion can derive from purely binocular stimuli, that is, without requiring any first-order motion perception. In other words, motion can be derived without using retinal flow, instead using optical flow understood in a more abstract sense.

It has been shown that also the adaptation to moving disparity information induces a motion aftereffect. This effect is called the stereoscopic motion aftereffect to distinguish it from the more well-known luminance motion aftereffect.

How the brain combines different cues, including stereo cues, motion cues (both temporal changes in disparity and monocular velocity ratios), vergence angle and monocular cues for sensing motion in depth and 3D object position is an area of active research in vision science and neighboring disciplines.

== See also ==
- Coarse and fine stereopsis
- Motion perception#Motion in depth
- Visual space#Space and its content
