= Random dot stereogram =

Type of 3D image

A random-dot stereogram (RDS) is stereo pair of images of random dots that, when viewed with the aid of a stereoscope, or with the eyes focused on a point in front of or behind the images, produces a sensation of depth due to stereopsis, with objects appearing to be in front of or behind the display level.

The random-dot stereogram technique, known since 1919, was elaborated on by Béla Julesz, described in his 1971 book, Foundations of Cyclopean Perception. Later concepts, involving single images, not necessarily consisting of random dots, and more well known to the general public, are autostereograms.

== History ==
In 1840, Sir Charles Wheatstone developed the stereoscope. Using it, two photographs, taken a small horizontal distance apart, could be viewed one to each eye so that the objects in the photograph appeared to be three-dimensional in a three-dimensional scene.

Around 1956, Béla Julesz initiated a project at Bell Labs aimed at identifying patterns within the output of random number generators. He decided to try mapping the numbers into images and using the pattern-detecting capabilities of the human visual system to look for a lack of randomness. Julesz noticed that two identical random images when viewed through a stereoscope, appeared as if they were projected onto a uniform flat surface. He experimented with the image pair by shifting a square area in the center of one of the images by a small amount. When he viewed this pair through the stereoscope, the square appeared to rise out from the page.

== Implications ==
The discovery of the random dot stereogram was intriguing not just for its ability to create depth sensations in printed images but also for its implications in cognitive science and the study of perception.

The random dot stereogram provided insight on how stereo vision is processed by the human brain. According to Ralph Siegel, Julesz had "unambiguously demonstrated that stereoscopic depth could be computed in the absence of any identifiable objects, in the absence of any perspective, in the absence of any cues available to either eye alone."

In his 1971 book, Julesz termed this cyclopean perception based on his whimsical notion that the depth could be seen only by a single, cyclopean eye, similar to the single eye of a cyclops.

== Random-dot stereotests ==
About 5% of individuals are unable to perceive depth in random-dot stereograms due to various disorders of binocular vision. These individuals can be identified with random-dot stereotests. The stereoacuity is measured from the patient's ability to identify forms from random dot backgrounds, as presented on several plates or pages of a book.

=== Randot stereotest ===
The randot stereotest is a vectograph random dot stereotest. It is frequently used for detecting amblyopia, strabismus and suppression, and for assessing stereoacuity. The Randot test can measure stereoacuity to 20 seconds of arc.

The randot stereotest is more sensitive to monocular blur than real depth stereotests such as the "Frisby test".

=== TNO random dot stereotest ===
The TNO random dot stereotest (short: TNO stereo test or TNO test) is similar to the randot stereotest but is an anaglyph in place of a vectograph; that is, the patient wears red-green glasses (in place of the polarizing glasses used in the randot stereotest). Like other random dot stereotests, the TNO test offers no monocular clues.

== Further developments ==
=== Efficiency ===
Observers' performance in recognizing the figure present in a stereogram in the presence of statistical noise has been found to be higher for a stereogram that consists in black and white dots on a grey background compared to a similar stereogram with only white (or only black) dots on a grey background.

=== Autostereograms ===
The name random dot stereogram specifically refers to pairs of images based on random dots. Additional work by Christopher Tyler and Maureen Clarke led to their inventing single images yielding depth without a stereoscope. These are known as single image random dot stereograms (SIRDS), or random dot autostereograms.

Replacing the random dot base pattern with an image or texture gives the form that made the single image stereogram known to the general public, through the Magic Eye series of books.

=== Dynamic random dot stereograms ===
Dynamic random-dot stereograms consist of a moving stereoscopic (cyclopean) form made of moving random dots, camouflaged by further random dots. The observer is to make a perceptual judgment about the shape and/or motion of the dichoptically presented moving form.

When presented with a dynamic random dot stereogram with stereoscopic (cyclopean) motion stimuli, stereoscopic motion is perceived by persons with normal binocular vision and more generally by those who have sufficient binocular vision for the task.

Dynamic random-dot stereograms containing binocular motion stimuli can be designed to test whether someone has at least rudimentary stereopsis. One study found that in strabismic patients a dynamic random dot stereogram yielded a significantly higher rate detection rate for stereopsis than the Titmus fly stereotest.

== Illustrated example ==
The process used to develop the first random-dot stereogram is illustrated below.

1. Create an image of suitable size. Fill it with random dots. Duplicate the image.
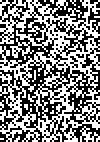
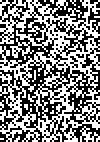

2. Select a region in one image, in this case, in the right image.
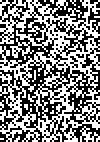

3. Shift this region horizontally by one or two dot diameters and fill in the empty region with new random dots. The stereogram is complete.
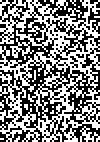
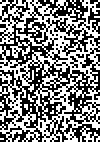

To view the stereogram, use a stereoscope to present the left image to the left eye and the right image to the right eye or focus on a point behind the image to achieve the same thing. (How to achieve this wall-eyed position of the eyes is described in Autostereogram). The shifted region of random dots will appear as a small, central, square area closer to your eyes than the larger, surrounding, rectangular area.

The shifted region produces the binocular disparity necessary to give a sensation of depth. A small shift yields a small amount of depth; a larger shift yields a larger amount of depth. If the shift is in the opposite horizontal direction, the depth will be reversed: The central, square area will appear as a square hole to a surface father from the eyes than the larger, surrounding, rectangular area. (A simple way to achieve this with the example stereogram is to adopt a cross-eyed position of the eyes; this presents the left image to the right eye and the right image to the left eye.)
