= Michael Kubovy =

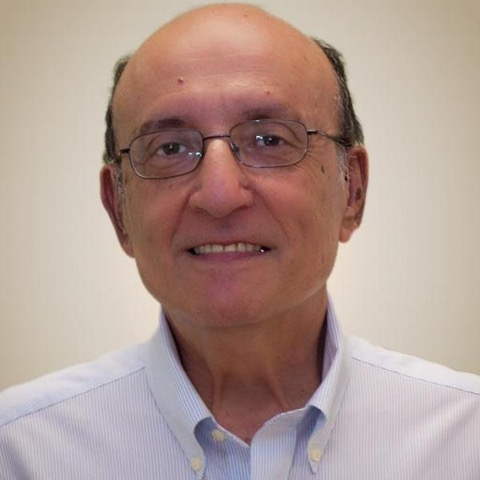
Michael Kubovy

Michael Kubovy (1940-2025) was an Israeli American psychologist known for his work on the psychology of perception and psychology of art.

His writings and research of visual and auditory perceptual organization helped to rekindle interest in the Gestalt School of Psychology in the late 20th century: a "rebirth" of Gestalt Psychology. This is reflected in a collection he co-edited, Perceptual Organization (1981).

His book The Psychology of Perspective and Renaissance Art (1986) introduced the concept of "the robustness of perspective" and helped to bridge the disciplines of perceptual psychology, art history, and art criticism.

== Early life and education ==
Michael Kubovy grew up in Israel, Czechoslovakia, and Argentina (because his father, Aryeh Leon Kubowitzki, was an Israeli senior diplomat). He served in the IDF and in 1967, when the Six-Day War broke out, while he was a graduate student, he fought with the "Jerusalem Brigade" (composed of Jerusalem residents, including many students and faculty from the Hebrew University of Jerusalem) in Tourgeman House at the border crossing between Israel and Jordan known as "Mandelbaum Gate."

He earned his Master's degree under Daniel Kahneman (1968) and his doctoral degree under Amos Tversky (1972), both in psychology and both from the Hebrew University of Jerusalem. The doctoral dissertation was titled Normative and Informational Aspects of Social Influence (1971).

== Career ==
Kubovy began his academic career at University of Illinois Urbana-Champaign in 1971, first as a postdoctoral researcher (advised by Emanuel Donchin) investigating human information processing by means of electroencephalography, and then as Visiting Assistant Professor (1972-1973). He later served as Assistant Professor and Associate Professor at Yale University (1973-1979) and as Associate Professor and Professor at Rutgers University–New Brunswick (1980-1987).

He was appointed Professor of Psychology at the University of Virginia in 1987, where he taught and directed a research laboratory in the Area of Cognitive Psychology for nearly 30 years, pursuing questions "in visual and auditory perception, cognition, psychology of visual art and music, the nature of pleasure, the philosophy of mind and the phenomenology of experience," conducting experiments with human observers, analyzing "visual and auditory patterns" and proposing "mathematical/statistical models of the data."

== Themes ==
=== Decision making ===
In his early work on statistical decision making, Kubovy studied the role of expected utility in perceptual decision making. An important outcome of this work was the finding that action consequences are underweighted (Healy & Kubovy, 1978; 1981), which means "in signal detection terms, [that] this result is consistent with empirically measured criterion shifts being closer to neutral than would be expected from an ideal observer model link. This work was summarized in Kubovy & Healy (1980).

=== Concurrent pitch segregation ===
In collaboration with the cognitive scientist James E. Cutting and the scientific programmer R. M. McGuire, Kubovy invented an auditory analog of the random-dot stereogram (Kubovy et al., 1974). The striking stimulus was created "by presenting eight simultaneous and continuous sine waves to both ears and by either phase-shifting or frequency-shifting one of them relative to its counterpart in the opposite ear. Particular tones were shifted in sequence such that a melody was heard which was undetectable by either ear alone." The melody embedded in the tonal arrays was the tune "Daisy Bell," selected for this recording because it was the first song performed by means of computer speech synthesis (used for the same reason in Stanley Kubrick's film 2001: A Space Odyssey, 1968). The melody was called "cyclotean" by analogy to the "cyclopean image" in the perception of random-dot stereograms.

An application to echoic memory soon followed (Kubovy & Howard, 1976). Then followed a decade of attempts to show that pitch was as much a carrier of "form" in auditory perception (Kubovy & Daniel, 1983). As the latter shows the results were there, but were heterogeneous, perhaps even disappointing. However, this work did lead to the theory of indispensable attributes (Kubovy, 1981). Over the years this led to two further developments summarized in two widely-cited overview articles (Kubovy & Van Valkenburg, 2001; Kubovy & Schutz, 2010).

=== Perceptual organization ===
In November 1977, Kubovy and the psychologist James R. Pomerantz organized a two-day symposium under the auspices of the Psychonomic Society. At the preceding meeting of the Society, they observed "cognitive psychologists' desire for a phenomenological and intellectual interaction with Gestalt psychology." Kubovy and Pomerantz later noted that

our colleagues mentioned Gestalt as some might praise a novel like Lolita: with faint embarrassment, brought on by concern that one's audience might think one enjoyed it for the wrong reasons.

The participants—who included Fred Attneave, Irving Biederman, Albert Bregman, Norma Graham, Julian Hochberg, Béla Julesz, Daniel Kahneman, Roger Shepard, and Michael Turvey, among others—agreed to contribute to a subsequent volume in which they would "convey the speculative and metatheoretical ground of their research" in the Gestalt tradition, in addition to "the solid data and carefully wrought theories that are the figure of their research." Published as Perceptual Organization (1981), the volume was introduced by Kubovy and Pomerantz:

Perceptual organization has been synonymous with Gestalt psychology, and Gestalt psychology has fallen into disrepute. In the heyday of Behaviorism, the few cognitive psychologists of the time pursued Gestalt phenomena. But today, Cognitive Psychology is married to Information Processing. (Some would say that it was a marriage of convenience.) After the wedding, Cognitive Psychology has come to look like a theoretically wrinkled Behaviorism; very few of the mainstream topics of Cognitive Psychology make explicit contact with Gestalt phenomena. In the background, Cognition's first love—Gestalt—is pining to regain favor.

The book (reprinted by Routledge in 2017) was pivotal to Gestalt phenomena entering the mainstream of psychological science.

In subsequent years, Kubovy led multiple studies of perceptual organization, building the foundation for a new area of perceptual research. Much of this work concentrated on developing new methodologies that allow one "to explore perceptual organization more rigorously than had hitherto been possible. These methodologies rely on the spontaneity and the multistability of grouping while taking care to minimize the effects of whatever voluntary control observers might have over what they see." These studies include, among others: Kubovy (1994), Kubovy & Wagemans (1995), Bertamini et al. (1997), Kubovy et al. (1998), Gepshtein & Kubovy (2000; 2005; 2007), Strother & Kubovy (2006), and Kubovy & Van Den Berg (2008).

=== The psychology of perspective ===
Kubovy's book The Psychology of Perspective and Renaissance Art was published in 1986 by Cambridge University Press (paperback in 1988). The book "recounts the lively history of the invention of perspective in the fifteenth century, and shows how, as soon as the invention spread, it was used to achieve subtle and fascinating aesthetic effects."

It is here that Kubovy introduced the influential concept of "the robustness of perspective, later summarized by Yang & Kubovy (1999) as follows:

Viewed from the center of projection, a perspective picture presents the pictorial depth information of a scene. Knowing the center of projection, one can reconstruct the depicted scene. Assuming another viewpoint is the center of projection will cause one to reconstruct a transformed scene. Despite these transformations, we appreciate pictures from other viewpoints.

Kubovy also argued against the influential claim advanced by Nelson Goodman (in Languages of Art) that all visual experience (including perception of perspectival representations) was merely a convention. In his polemic against Goodman's notion that geometric rules of pictorial representation are established by consensus, Kubovy argued that

geometry does not rule supreme in the Land of Perspective [...] In fact, if in the Land of Perspective geometry plays a role analogous to the role played by Congress in the United States, then perception has the function of the Constitution. Whatever is prescribed by the geometry of central projection is tested against its acceptability to perception. If a law is unconstitutional, it is rejected and must be rewritten to accord with perception. (p. 125)

The book received multiple accolades, described by Ernst Gombrich as "excellent," and by Samuel Egerton, Jr. as a volume "full of tantalizing observations which students of word and image will find endlessly applicable." The American philosopher and cultural critic David Carrier of Carnegie Mellon University summarized Kubovy's work as follows:

This clearly written, well illustrated book provides the best introduction I have read to the central problems [of perspective]. Starting with a highly original interpretation of Mantegna's Archers Shooting at Saint Christopher in which, Kubovy argues, the arrow entering the eye of the watching king is a metaphor for the art of perspective, he offers an account of Brunelleschi's pioneering experimentation with perspective, trompe l'oeil baroque ceilings, the effects of seeing perspectival pictures from 'off-center' positions, the highly complex perspective of Leonardo's Last Supper, and critique of Nelson Goodman's claim that perspective is merely a convention. This wide-ranging study combines art historical observations, appeal to experimental psychology and concern with the philosophical literature in a text which is at once erudite and not needlessly difficult to read.

The book was translated into several languages, including Italian (as La freccia nell'occhio in 1992) and Spanish (as Psicología de la perspectiva y el arte del Renacimiento in 1996). The title of the Italian translation (which means "The arrow in the eye") reflects Kubovy's original choice of the book title, disfavored by the English publisher.

=== Psychology of pleasure ===
In the 1990s, Kubovy developed the conception of the "pleasures of the mind" which he proposed to distinguish from "pleasures of the body." In his seminal article on the subject (Kubovy, 1999), the notion of pleasures of the mind was traced back to Epicurus, "who regarded pleasures of the mind as superior to pleasures of the body because they were more varied and durable." Kubovy argued that pleasures of the mind "have been neglected by contemporary psychology" and that "their scope and their differentiation from other pleasures and from emotions need to be explored and eventually specified." He noted that "basic emotions are different from pleasures of the mind because emotions are constituents of pleasures of the mind." Kubovy suggested that pleasures of the mind be studied by pursuing specific conjectures, such as:

Conjecture 1. The pleasures of the mind are collections of emotions distributed over time. Conjecture 2. The pleasures of the mind are collections of emotions distributed over time whose global evaluation depends on the intensity of the peak emotion and favorability of the end.

Results of this work led Kubovy to conclude that pleasures of the mind "differ from each other in three ways: the emotions they consist of, their temporal organization, and the objects of these emotions."

=== The structure of lives ===
In the 2000s, Kubovy proposed to distinguish two conceptions of the structure of human life. One conception is the "stream of behavior," which Kubovy called "flat," and which he attributed to William James and his famous notion of the stream of thought:

Psychology has always treated behavior and experience as embedded in a unidimensional flow in time, the "stream of behavior." This means that events and actions occupy non-overlapping time-intervals in this stream. Nevertheless a phenomenological analysis reveals that the structure of lives is richer and far more interesting."

The other conception is that of "concurrent strands." Using Herbert A. Simon's notion of near-decomposability, Kubovy proposed to describe the structure of lives

as a composite of nearly independent strands that run concurrently, and are asynchronous. This is a "deep structure" of lives in contrast to the current conception, which conceives of lives as "flat."

To explain the new conception of concurrent but asynchronous strands, Kubovy proposed a thought experiment:

Imagine a building with rooms that have thick exterior and interior walls. These rooms are divided into thin-walled cubicles. Now suppose a storm suddenly forces the building into a temperature disequilibrium, so that there are sizable temperature differences within cubicles, between adjoining cubicles, between adjoining rooms, and between the building and the outdoors. Suppose also that the storm shut off the heating and the AC, and that the outside temperature remains steady, and that at this moment we begin to measure the evolution of the indoor temperatures.

The temperature within cubicles will rapidly become uniform; gradually, the temperature of the cubicles in each room will approach equality; more slowly, the temperatures of the different rooms will converge. Finally, the temperature of the rooms will be equal to the outside temperature.

Now imagine that the building is the life of a person, who we will call π. The rooms are strands, and the cubicles are substrands. Now suppose that each cubicle contains a space-heater whose thermostat is set at a different temperature. The temperatures in different cubicles in the same room, being poorly insulated from each other, despite the different thermostat settings, will tend to fluctuate together. This is also true—but to a lesser degree—of the temperatures in different rooms.

The near-decomposability of lives into strands implies that—over the course of π's life—strands will fluctuate together. But in the shorter run, strands will be independent.

Kubovy argued that "such compartmentalization is not only normal, but an indicator of mental and physical health. Its failure is, at the very least, an indication of stress."

== Personal life ==
Michael's father, Aryeh Leon Kubovy (Kubowitzki) (1896–1966) was born in the city Kuršėnai in Lithuania. Educated in the Université libre de Bruxelles and University of Liège, he earned a doctorate in classical philology for his dissertation on the use of Greek and Latin loan words in the language of Jewish Rabbinical Literature (Chazal). A Belgian citizen from 1926, he became a well-known Zionist leader and lawyer, serving as the editor of the Zionist biweekly התקווה (Hope) in French, publishing a Zionist Socialist magazine פאָלק און ארבעט (People and Work) in Yiddish, while taking active part in the Belgian socialist movement. When in Israel, Aryeh Kubovy served as the Israeli Ambassador to Czechoslovakia and Poland (1951-1952) and later to Argentina, Paraguay, and Chile (1953-1959). In 1959 he became the chairman of Israel's official memorial to the victims of the Holocaust Yad Vashem (יָד וַשֵׁם) in Jerusalem. Michael's mother, the poet, author, and journalist Myriam Goldstein-Kubovy (1897-1992), was born in Antwerp. She was a leader of the Zionist movement in Belgium and later of the international Zionist organization Pioneer Women in the United States.

Kubovy was married to the composer and sound artist Judith Shatin, who was William R. Kenan, Jr. Professor and Chair of McIntire Department of Music at the University of Virginia, and who founded and directed the Virginia Center for Computer Music.

Kubovy's son from the first marriage (to Miri Kubovy) is the director, writer, and producer Itamar Kubovy (born 1967), who was the first Executive Creative Director of the American modern dance company Pilobolus.

== Awards and recognition ==
2018: Perceptual structures: A Festschrift for Michael Kubovy, 41st European Conference on Visual Perception

2013: Paolo Bozzi prize in Ontology, Turin, Italy

2009: Resident scholar, Casa Zia Lina of the Swiss Thyll Foundation, the Island of Elba, Italy

2007: Member, International Franqui Prize Jury

2004: Residency, Rockefeller Foundation's Study & Conference Center, Bellagio, Italy

2003: The Wertheimer Lecture, Frankfurt, Germany

2003: The Kanizsa Lecture, Trieste, Italy

2001: Guggenheim Fellow, John Simon Guggenheim Memorial Foundation

1999: Irvin Rock Memorial Lecture, University of California at Berkeley

1998: James McKeen Cattell Fund Fellowship

1995: Elected Fellow, Society of Experimental Psychologists

1990: Senior Fellow, Commonwealth Center for Cultural and Literary Change, The University of Virginia

1989: Fellow, American Psychological Society

== Selected publications ==
=== Articles on decision making ===
Healy, A. F., & Kubovy, M. (1978). The effects of payoffs and prior probabilities on indices of performance and cutoff location in recognition memory. Memory & Cognition, 6(5), 544-553.

Healy, A. F., & Kubovy, M. (1981). Probability matching and the formation of conservative decision rules in a numerical analog of signal detection. Journal of Experimental Psychology: Human Learning and Memory, 7(5), 344.

Kubovy, M., & Gilden, D. (1991). Apparent randomness is not always the complement of apparent order. In G. Lockhead & J. R. Pomerantz (Eds.), The Perception of Structure, 115–127. Washington, DC: American Psychological Association.

Kubovy, M. & Healy, A. F. (1980). Process models of probabilistic categorization. In Wallsten, T. (Ed.) Cognitive processes in choice and decision behavior, 239–262. Hillsdale: Lawrence Erlbaum Associates.

=== Books and articles on perception and cognition ===
Kubovy, M. (1981). Concurrent pitch segregation and the theory of indispensable attributes.. In Kubovy, M. and Pomerantz, J. R., editors, Perceptual organization, pages 55–98. Lawrence Erlbaum, Hillsdale, NJ, USA. [Kubovy, M. (2017). Concurrent-pitch segregation and the theory of indispensable attributes. In Perceptual organization (pp. 55–98). Routledge. (Reprint)]

Bertamini, M., & Kubovy, M (Eds.). (2006). Human Perception. Aldershot, Ashgate, UK.

Kubovy, M., Epstein, W., & Gepshtein, S. (2012). Visual perception: Theoretical and methodological foundations. In Healy, A. F. & Proctor, R. W. (Eds), Experimental Psychology, 87-119, Volume 4 in Weiner, I. B. (Editor-in-Chief) Handbook of Psychology. John Wiley & Sons, New York, USA.

Van Valkenburg, D., & Kubovy, M. (2004). From Gibson's fire to Gestalts: A bridgebuilding theory of perceptual objecthood. In J. Neuhoff (Ed.), Ecological Psychoacoustics, 113–147. San Diego, CA: Elsevier Science.

=== Books and articles on art and experience ===
Kubovy, M. (1988). The Psychology of Perspective and Renaissance Art. Cambridge University Press.

Kubovy, M. (1999). On the pleasures of the mind. In Kahneman D, Diener E, Schwarz N, eds. Well-Being: The Foundations of Hedonic Psychology. New York: Russell Sage Foundation, 134-154.

Kubovy, M. (2015). The deep structure of lives. Philosophia Scientiæ. Travaux d'histoire et de philosophie des sciences, 19(3), 153-176.

Kubovy, M. (2020). Lives as collections of strands: an essay in descriptive psychology. Perspectives on Psychological Science, 15(2), 497-515.

Kubovy, M. (2020). Neuroaesthetics: maladies and remedies. Art & Perception, 8(1), 1-26.

Yang, T., & Kubovy, M. (1999). Weakening the robustness of perspective: Evidence for a modified theory of compensation in picture perception. Perception & Psychophysics, 61(3), 456-467.

=== Articles on perceptual organization ===
Bertamini, M., Friedenberg, J. D., & Kubovy, M. (1997). Detection of symmetry and perceptual organization: The way a lock-and-key process works. Acta Psychologica, 95(2), 119-140.

Bianchi, I., Savardi, U., & Kubovy, M. (2011). Dimensions and their poles: A metric and topological approach to opposites. Language and Cognitive Processes, 26(8), 1232-1265.

Gepshtein, S., & Kubovy, M. (2000). The emergence of visual objects in space-time. Proceedings of the National Academy of Sciences, 97(14), 8186-8191.

Gepshtein, S., & Kubovy, M. (2005). Stability and change in perception: spatial organization in temporal context. Experimental Brain Research, 160(4), 487-495.

Gepshtein, S., & Kubovy, M. (2007). The lawful perception of apparent motion. Journal of Vision, 7(8), 1-15.

Getz, L. M., & Kubovy, M. (2018). Questioning the automaticity of audiovisual correspondences. Cognition, 175, 101-108.

Kubovy, M. (1977). Response availability and the apparent spontaneity of numerical choices. Journal of Experimental Psychology: Human Perception and Performance, 3(2), 359-364.

Kubovy, M. (1994). The perceptual organization of dot lattices. Psychonomic Bulletin & Review, 1(2), 182-190.

Kubovy, M. (2014). Spatial Proximity and Similarity. In The Oxford Handbook of Computational Perceptual Organization. Edited by Gepshtein, S., Maloney L. T., and Singh, M.

Kubovy, M., Cutting, J. E., & McGuire, R. M. (1974). Hearing with the third ear: Dichotic perception of a melody without monaural familiarity cues. Science, 186(4160), 272-274.

Kubovy, M., & Gepshtein, S. (2003). Perceptual grouping in space and in space-time: An exercise in phenomenological psychophysics. In Behrmann M, Kimchi R, and Olson CR (Eds) Perceptual Organization in Vision: Behavioral and Neural Perspectives, 45-85. Lawrence Erlbaum, Mahwah, NJ, USA.

Kubovy, M., Holcombe, A. O., & Wagemans, J. (1998). On the lawfulness of grouping by proximity. Cognitive Psychology, 35(1), 71-98.

Kubovy, M., & Pomerantz, J. R. (1981). Perceptual Organization. Hillsdale: Lawrence Erlbaum Associates. [Reprinted by Routledge in 2017 as Volume 16 in Psychology library editions: Perception . ]

Kubovy, M., & Schutz, M. (2010). Audio-visual objects. Review of Philosophy and Psychology, 1(1), 41-61.

Kubovy, M., & Van Den Berg, M. (2008). The whole is equal to the sum of its parts: A probabilistic model of grouping by proximity and similarity in regular patterns. Psychological review, 115(1), 131.

Kubovy, M., & Van Valkenburg, D. (2001). Auditory and visual objects. Cognition, 80(1-2), 97-126.

Kubovy, M., & Wagemans, J. (1995). Grouping by proximity and multistability in dot lattices: A quantitative Gestalt theory. Psychological Science, 6(4), 225-234.

Pomerantz, J. R., & Kubovy, M. (1986). Theoretical approaches to perceptual organization: Simplicity and likelihood principles. In Boff, Kenneth R. (Ed); Kaufman, Lloyd (Ed); Thomas, James P. (Ed). (1986). Handbook of Perception and Human Performance, Vol. 2: Cognitive Processes and Performance.

Strother, L., & Kubovy, M. (2006). On the surprising salience of curvature in grouping by proximity. Journal of Experimental Psychology: Human Perception and Performance, 32(2), 226 -234.
