= Wagemans =

Wagemans is a surname. Notable people with the surname include:

- Bob Benny (born Emilius Wagemans, 1926—2011), Belgian singer and musical theatre performer
- Georges Wagemans (1880–1966), Belgian figure skater
- Johan Wagemans, Belgian experimental psychologist and professor
- Julianus Wagemans (1890–1965), Belgian gymnast
- Peter-Jan Wagemans (b. 1952), Dutch composer

== See also ==
- Waegemans
- Wageman (disambiguation)
