= Cyclodisparity =

Difference in rotation angle of the scene viewed by the left and right eyes

In vision science, cyclodisparity is the difference in the rotation angle of an object or scene viewed by the left and right eyes. Cyclodisparity can result from the eyes' torsional rotation (cyclorotation) or can be created artificially by presenting to the eyes two images that need to be rotated relative to each other for binocular fusion to take place.

== Human and animal vision ==
The eyes and visual system can compensate for cyclodisparity up to a certain point; if the cyclodisparity is larger than a threshold, the images cannot be fused, resulting stereoblindness, and in double vision in subjects who otherwise have full stereo vision.

When a human subject is presented with images that have artificial cyclodisparity, cyclovergence is evoked, that is, a motor response of the eye muscles that rotates the two eyes in opposite directions, thereby reducing cyclodisparity. Visually-induced cyclovergence of up to 8 degrees has been observed in normal subjects. Furthermore, up to about 8 degrees can usually be compensated by purely sensory means, that is, without physical eye rotation. This means that the normal human observer can achieve binocular image fusion in presence of cyclodisparity of up to approximately 16 degrees.

Cyclodisparity due to images having been rotated inward can be compensated better when the gaze is directed downwards, and cyclodisparity due to an outward rotation can be compensated better when the gaze is directed upwards. A proposed explanation for this phenomenon is that the motor system is coordinated in such a way that the eyes perform a torsional movement to reduce the size of the search zones and thus the computational load required for solving the correspondence problem. The resulting cyclovergence at near gaze is smaller than the cyclovergence predicted by Listing's law.

== Video processing and computer vision ==
Active camera torsion can be used in machine and computer vision for several purposes. For instance, camera torsion can be used to make improved use of the search range over which matching detectors or stereo matching algorithms operate, or to make a 3D slanted surface appear frontoparallel for further stereo processing.

For image compression purposes, images with cyclodisparity are advantageously encoded using global motion compensation using a rotational motion model.
