= Stereo test =

A stereo test may refer to:

- In acoustics, a test of the ability to distinguish stereophonic sound
- In vision, a test of the ability for stereopsis, see Stereopsis test
