= Stereoblindness =

Medical condition resulting in no depth perception

Stereoblindness (also spelled stereo blindness) is the inability to perceive in three-dimensional (3D) depth using stereopsis, or stereo vision, by combining and comparing images from the two eyes.

Individuals with only one functioning eye have this condition by definition, as there is no visual input from the second eye. The condition can also occur when both eyes are healthy but do not function together properly.

Most stereoblind individuals with two healthy eyes use binocular vision to some extent, although less effectively than individuals with normal visual development. This was shown in a study in which stereoblind subjects were posed with the task of judging the direction of rotation of a simulated transparent cylinder: the subjects performed better when using two eyes than when using their preferred eye. They appeared to judge the direction of rotation using the images from each eye separately, then combined the judgments, rather than relying on differences between the images in both eyes. Also, purely binocular motion stimuli appear to influence stereoblind persons' sensation of self-motion. Furthermore, in some cases, each eye may contribute to peripheral vision on one side of the field of view (see also monofixation syndrome).

However, there is an exception: individuals with true congenital alternating squints have two healthy eyes and the ability to voluntarily switch between using either eye. However, stereoscopic and three-dimensional vision cannot be achieved in this condition. Attempts to train individuals with congenital alternating squints to use binocular vision often result in double vision, which may be irreversible.

== Notable cases ==
It has been suggested that the Dutch Old Master Rembrandt may have been stereoblind, which could have aided him in flattening visual perception for the creation of two-dimensional (2D) works. Scientists have suggested that more artists seem to have stereoblindness when compared with a sample of people with stereo-acuteness (normal stereo vision).

British neurologist Oliver Sacks lost his stereoscopic vision in 2009 due to a malignant tumor in his right eye, leaving him with no vision in that eye. His loss of stereovision was recounted in his book The Mind's Eye, published in October 2010.

In 2012, one case of stereoblindness was improved by watching a 3D film.

== See also ==
- Amblyopia
- Stereopsis
- Stereopsis recovery
- Strabismus
- "Stereo" Sue Barry

== Bibliography ==
- Barry, Susan R. (2009). Fixing My Gaze: A Scientist's Journey Into Seeing in Three Dimensions. New York: Basic Books. ISBN 978-0-465-02073-7.
