= Texton =

The term texton was introduced by Béla Julesz in 1981 to describe "the putative units of pre-attentive human texture perception." The term reemerged in the late 1990s and early 2000s to describe vector quantized responses of a linear filter bank.
