= Binoviewer =

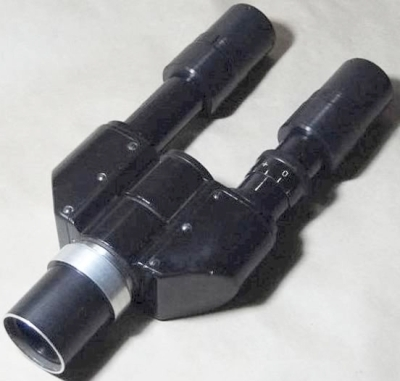
Binoviewer

A binoviewer is an optical device designed to enable binocular viewing through a single objective, primarily to reduce fatigue when peering down a single objective.

== Design ==
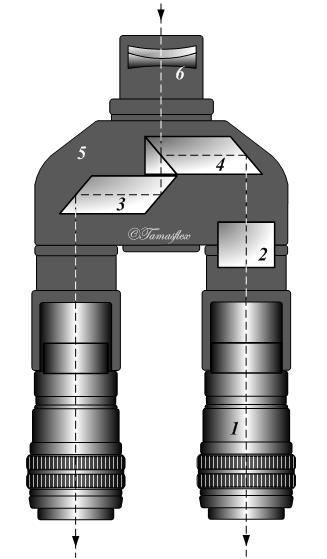
A binoviewer for an astronomical telescope.: 1. Eyepiece; 2. Compensation slide; 3. Prism; 4. Beam splitter; 5. Body; 6. Barlow lens

In contrast to binoculars and stereo microscopes, which provide independent optical paths to each eye, both images in the binoviewer are produced by the same objective and do not differ except for aberrations induced by the binoviewer itself. Because the eyes and brain still process the image binocularly, it provides a false stereoscopic view from a fundamentally monocular design.

A binoviewer consists of a beam splitter which splits the image provided by the objective into two identical (but fainter) copies, and a system of prisms or mirrors that relay the images to a pair of identical eyepieces. The two eyepieces serve to provide greater viewing comfort.

The binoviewer was first popularized by a design credited to Francis Herbert Wenham around 1860. The binoviewer was refined using roof prisms by Jentzsch and Siedentopf in the 1910s.

=== Applications ===
Binoviewers are a standard component of laboratory microscopes and are also used with optical telescopes, particularly in amateur astronomy.

Trinocular splitters are also used, where a camera is to be attached as well.
