= Judith Shatin =

American composer

Judith Shatin (Allen) (born November 21, 1949) is an American composer.

== Biography ==
Shatin was born and raised in Albany, New York, to a clinical psychologist father and a microbiologist mother. At the age of five, her father bought her a piano and she fell in love with music. In her youth, she learned to play the flute.

She holds degrees from Douglass College, the Juilliard School, and Princeton University, at which institution she was a pupil of Milton Babbitt.

Currently, she is William R. Kenan, Jr. Professor at the University of Virginia. She also founded and is Director of the Virginia Center for Computer Music.

In 2012 Shatin was honored as one of the Library of Virginia's "Virginia Women in History".

In 2025, Shatin scored Floes. It was created by processing underwater recordings of icebergs, and was featured in the 2025 program, "Dancing For Our Wonderful World" from vildwerk., an environmental dance nonprofit which aims to increase environmental conservation awareness through dance. Virginie Mécène choreographed Floes, and it was performed by Grace Sautter.

She was married to Psychologist professor Michael Kubovy.
