= Johan Wagemans =

Belgian experimental psychologist

- Born: 1963 (age 62–63)
- Citizenship: Belgium
- Education: KU Leuven
- Known for: Revision of Gestalt Psychology
- Scientific career
- Fields: experimental psychology
- Thesis: (Ph.D. 1991)
- Doctoral advisor: Géry van Outryve d'Ydewalle
- Website: https://gestaltrevision.be/

Johan Wagemans (born 1963) is a Belgian experimental psychologist. He is a full professor at the KU Leuven in Leuven (Belgium). He directs a long-term Methusalem project that focuses upon the psychology and neuroscience of visual perception and most recently art perception.

== Biography ==
Wagemans obtained his PhD in 1991 at KU Leuven. As a postdoc he worked with Michael Kubovy at the University of Virginia. He is a professor at KU Leuven since 1993.

Wagemans is known for his work on so-called mid-level vision, which deals with organising the rich but not yet very useful representation of visual images in earlier processing stages into a more coherent and meaningful organisation. In several review articles he brought together the leading scholars on perceptual organisation in order to integrate early century-old views of Gestalt psychology with modern viewpoints inspired by modern cognitive psychology and neuroscience. He formalised several important factors that influence perceptual organisation, such as the role of symmetry in perceptual grouping. His work also resulted in applications to theories on autism, art perception, and the perception of magic.

== Honors ==
- Member of the Royal Flemish Academy of Belgium, 2010
- Laureate of the Research Foundation Flanders "Hearnest-John Solvay" Excellence Prize, 2020, the highest scientific Prize in Belgium known as the "Flemish Nobel Prize"
- Member of the Board of Directors of the Vision Sciences Society, 2018-2022
- Wolfgang Metzger Award of Gestalt Theory Association, 2013
