= Wageman =

Wageman may refer to:

- Thomas Charles Wageman (1787–1863) British artist
- The Wagiman, also spelt Wageman, an Aboriginal Australian people
- Wagiman language, also spelt Wageman, an Aboriginal Australian language

== See also ==
- Wagemans
