= Cyclopean image =

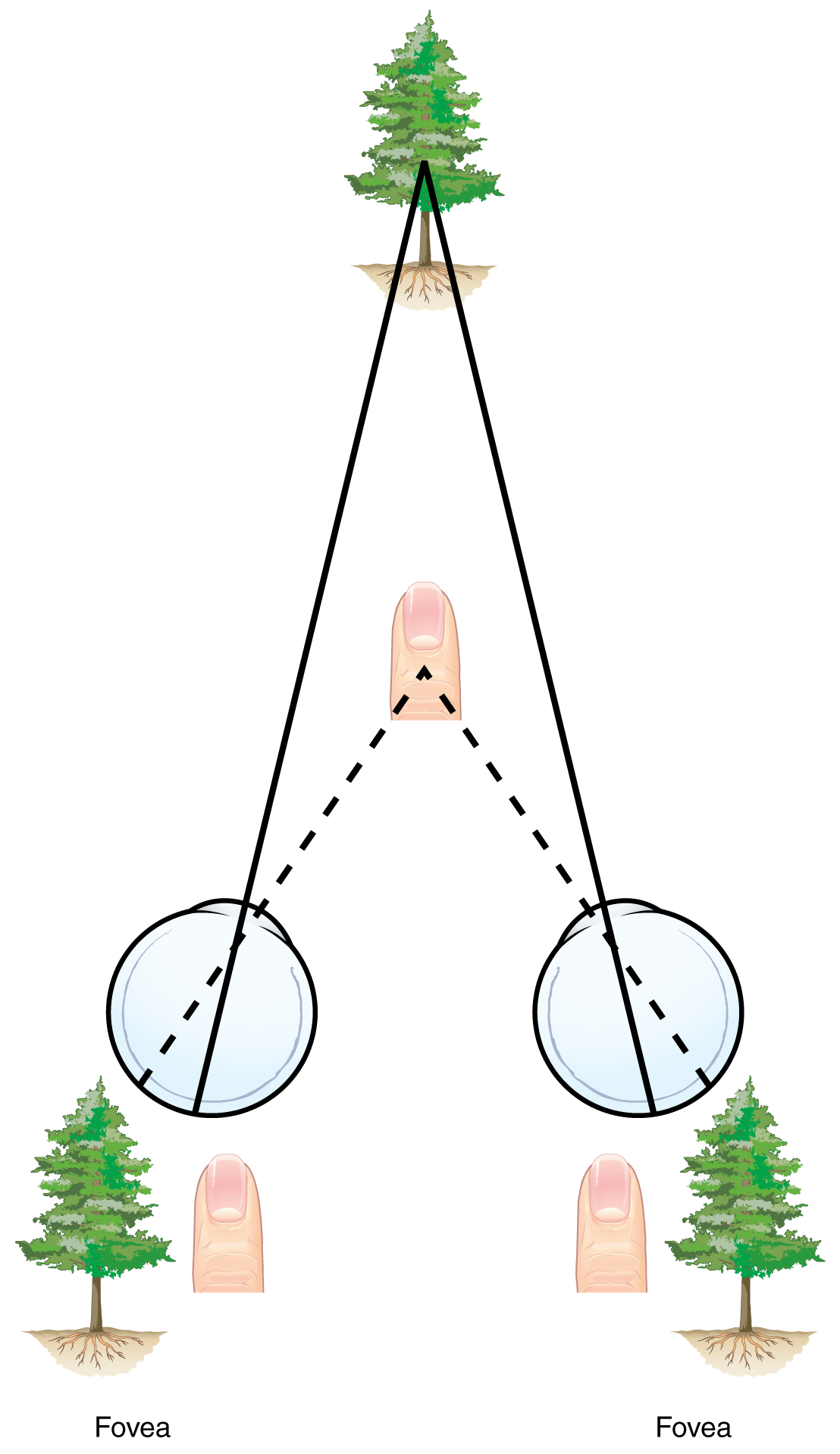
Objects in space are evaluated on different points of the retina. Binocular disparity is crucial for the brain to develop a cyclopean image.

Cyclopean image is a single mental image of a scene created by the brain through the process of combining two images received from both eyes. The mental process behind the Cyclopean image is crucial to stereo vision. Autostereograms take advantage of this process in order to trick the brain to form an apparent Cyclopean image from seemingly random patterns. These random patterns often appear in daily life, such as in art, children's books, and architecture.

Cyclopean image is named after the mythical being, Cyclops, a creature possessing one single eye. The single refers to the way stereo sighted viewers perceive the center of their fused visual field as lying between the two physical eyes, as if seen by a cyclopean eye. Alternative terms for cyclopean eye include third central imaginary eye and binoculus.

The term cyclopean stimuli refer to a form of visual stimuli that is defined by binocular disparity alone. It was named after the one-eyed Cyclops of Homer’s Odyssey. The term cyclopean in the terms of binocular disparity was coined by Bela Julesz. Julesz was a Hungarian radar engineer who predicted that stereopsis might help to discover hidden objects, which could prove useful in the finding of camouflaged objects. The important aspect of this research was that Julesz showed using random dot stereograms was sufficient for stereopsis, whereas Charles Wheatstone had only shown that binocular disparity was necessary for stereopsis.

There is a point of irony to the origin of the term cyclopean. The Cyclops from Homer's Odyssey would not have been able to see a cyclopean stimulus, as he only possessed one eye. In order for stereopsis to occur, an individual must be able to make use of binocular depth cues, a skill the namesake of the term would not be able to utilize.

Binocular disparity as it relates to cyclopean images has become an interest in research due to a rise in three dimensional technology usage. Three dimensional technology exists not only in research settings but in entertainment industries as well. Because cyclopean images are created using binocular depth cues, cyclopean images are important in understanding the surroundings of an individual in any given environment. Images with greater salience allow for an optimal use of a cyclopean image, as important details can be extracted. In other words, an image of higher quality has more meaning to the eye. Although it has limitations due to the surroundings, cyclopean images can be very adaptive.

Proposed technology wishes to use the ideas behind cyclopean imagery as a way to evaluate the quality of images used in search engines. Because images with higher salience provide meaning and context to a situation, technology utilizing this software would be able to sift through information and find what constitutes high and low quality images. A current topic in research is to create an artificial intelligence that would examine an image and generate meaningful and correct information. There are certain concerns when it comes to utilizing cyclopean images in advancing technology, one of which is eye strain. Another concern is whether the technology still functions when images are distorted in various ways. The connection between technology and the human body is not a new idea. For years, researchers have compared the human mind to an advanced computer, and have used this comparison to elevate the technology we use today.
