= Béla Julesz =

Psychologist (1928–2003)

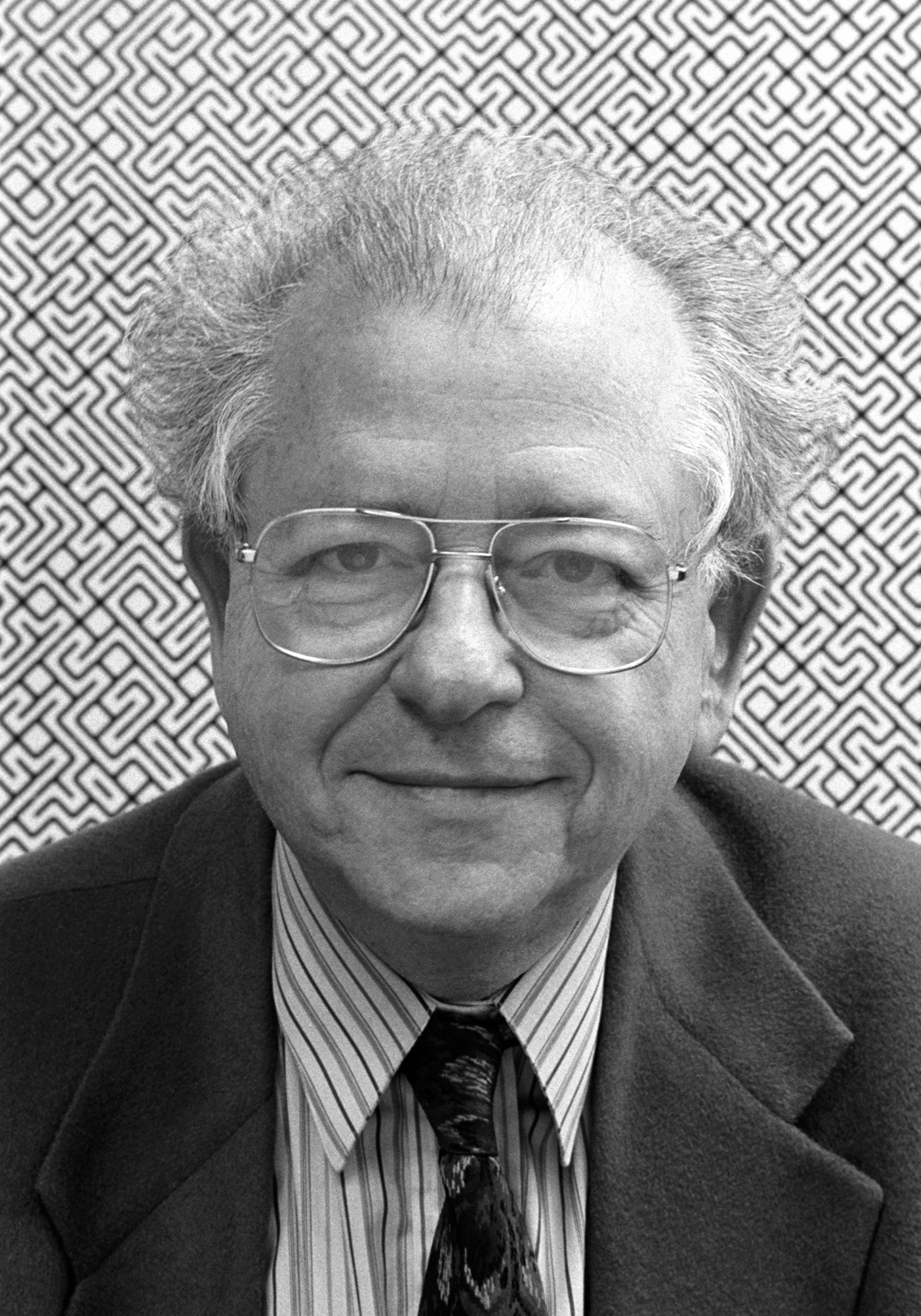
Béla Julesz in front of a picture from his and A. Michael Noll's computer art exhibition, Computer-Generated Pictures, held at the Howard Wise Gallery, New York City, in 1965

Béla Julesz (also Bela Julesz in English; February 19, 1928 – December 31, 2003) was a Hungarian-born American visual neuroscientist and experimental psychologist in the fields of visual and auditory perception.

Julesz was the originator of random dot stereograms which led to the creation of autostereograms. He also was the first to study texture discrimination by constraining second-order statistics.

== Biography ==
Béla Julesz was born in Budapest, Hungary, on February 19, 1928. He graduated from Budapest University of Technology and Economics in 1950. He started his electrical engineering career at the Telecommunications Research Institute. He immigrated to the United States with his wife Margit after receiving his Ph.D. from the Hungarian Academy of Sciences in 1956. The topic of his doctoral thesis was the theory of microwave systems and television signals.

In 1956, Julesz joined the renowned Bell Telephone Laboratories, Incorporated, where he headed the Sensory and Perceptual Processes Department (1964–1982), then the Visual Perception Research Department (1983–1989). Much of his research focused on physiological psychology topics including depth perception and pattern recognition within the visual system.

In 1959, Julesz created the random-dot stereogram using pairs of random dot patterns that were identical except for slight differences in the horizontal position of a subset of dots. When these patterns were viewed one to each eye via a stereoscope, the subset of dots appeared to be at a different depth from the remainder. Julesz referred to this, whimsically, as cyclopean vision, after the mythical Cyclopes, creatures with a single eye in their forehead instead of the usual two. This was because the shape of the depth area was invisible to either eye separately; it is visible only to the cyclopean eye of stereoscopic perception that combines the information from the two eyes. Later, Christopher Tyler, a former student of Julesz, used the principles of random-dot stereograms to invent autostereograms, which create the same effect using a single image instead of two.

Julesz made important contributions to the theory of human visual perception of texture. In 1962 he originated the Julesz Conjecture, which states that humans cannot distinguish between textures with identical second-order statistics. In 1973, he proved this conjecture false, though the concept that image textures could be modeled based on low-order statistics remained. In 1981, he originated the Texton Theory, which states that textons, composed of local image features, are "the putative units of pre-attentive human texture perception".

In 1989, he retired from Bell Labs and began teaching in the psychology department at Rutgers University in Piscataway, New Jersey. It was there that he established and directed the Laboratory of Vision Research, which was dedicated to investigating mechanisms of stereopsis, motion, binocular vision, texture perception and attention. The lab helped establish cognitive science, neuroscience, and vision science as important fields of study at Rutgers. Julesz became professor emeritus in 1999, and remained the director of the lab until his death on December 31, 2003 at the age of 75.

== Education ==
- 1950 - Electrical Engineering, Budapest University of Technology and Economics
- 1956 - Ph.D., Hungarian Academy of Sciences

== Publications ==
Béla Julesz authored or collaborated on more than 200 publications, including Foundations of Cyclopean Perception (1971). This book is often considered a classic of psychophysics and cognitive science, and has recently been added to the Millennium Project list of the 100 most-influential cognitive science books in the 20th century. This book has been republished in 2006 at MIT press.

== Awards ==
Julesz was a State of New Jersey Professor who received a variety of awards throughout his career, including a 1983 MacArthur Fellowship for his work in Experimental Psychology and Artificial Intelligence. He was elected to the American Academy of Arts and Sciences in 1980, the National Academy of Sciences in 1987, and the American Philosophical Society in 1995.
