= Binocular disparity =

Cue to determine relative depth of an object

Binocular disparity is the difference between the images from the left and right eyes. This difference can be caused by one or more of the following:

- horizontal disparity: a difference caused by the left and right eyes looking from slightly different directions, which can cause depth differences between objects to be perceived;
- vertical disparity, which is associated with vertical misalignments and tilting the head; and
- cyclodisparity which is associated with unequal rotations of the two eyes around their visual axes;
- aniseikonia: a significant difference in the size of the retinal images in the two eyes.

Vertical disparity, cyclodisparity and aniseikonia can impair depth perception and may cause double vision (diplopia).

The horopter is used in research to describe the relationship between disparity and depth perception (stereopsis), and between disparity and double images.

== Horizontal disparity ==
Horizontal disparity of P relative to the fixation point = α - β

In 1861, Ewald Hering defined "horizontal disparity" of a point P relative to the fixation point as the difference between the angles α and β in the figure, which represent a specific distance on the retina. This difference gives a sensation of depth relative to the fixation point and was later called "absolute disparity". The concept of "relative disparity" is used as a measure of the depth between two objects, regardless of the fixation point. Human research suggests that our brains determine absolute disparity and, in a second step, derive the relative disparities between objects from this.

In stereo vision (stereoscopy), horizontal disparity is also expressed as the number of pixels the image in the right frame is shifted relative to the left frame.

Disparity as parallax

Horizontal disparity is sometimes called binocular parallax. However, parallax only occurs when the observer and their surroundings are moving relative to each other. The sensation of depth in motion parallax is very similar to the sensation of depth in horizontal disparity. In both cases, stereopsis occurs, where people and objects at different distances appear "separate" from each other. Although relative distances can be estimated very precisely, this is not true for the distance to the observer, which is not perceived as precisely.

== Horopter ==
The horopter. Point C has a crossed disparity, point P has parallel disparity.

The horopter has been used to describe the relation between disparity and stereopsis, and between disparity and double images. It depicts points with zero disparity relative to the fixation point (α = β).

Horizontal disparity, and in some cases also vertical disparity, can contribute to stereopsis, but only if horizontal, vertical and cyclo disparities are limited in size.

Horizontal disparity is also associated with the separation perceived between so-called double images. Zero disparities and small disparities are associated with seeing fused images in directional vision.

== Application ==
Wheatstone invented the stereoscope in 1838 and proved that horizontal disparity is sufficient to experience stereopsis. Since then many applications have been realized, which vary from instruments like the binocular microscope to aids for stereoscopy.

In medicine disparity is used to detect and correct disorders in binocular vision.

Knowledge of disparity can be used in extraction of information from stereo images. One case in which disparity is most useful is for depth/distance calculation. Disparity and distance from the cameras are inversely related. As the distance from the cameras increases, the disparity decreases. This allows for depth perception in stereo images. Using geometry and algebra, the points that appear in the 2D stereo images can be mapped as coordinates in 3D space.

This concept is particularly useful for navigation. For example, the Mars Exploration Rover uses a similar method for scanning the terrain for obstacles. The Rover captures a pair of images with its stereoscopic navigation cameras and disparity calculations are performed in order to detect elevated objects (such as boulders). Additionally, location and speed data can be extracted from subsequent stereo images by measuring the displacement of objects relative to the Rover. In some cases, this is the best source of this type of information, as the encoder sensors in the wheels may be inaccurate due to tire slippage.

Depth information based on disparity is not always clear-cut (correspondence problem). In humans, this leads to the double-nail illusion.

== See also ==
- Binocular vision
- Directional vision
- Stereopsis#Binocular disparity
- Epipolar geometry
