= Foundations of Cyclopean Perception =

Book by Bela Julesz

- Title page for Foundations of Cyclopean Perception (1971)
- Author: Bela Julesz
- Language: English
- Subject: Cognitive Science
- Genre: Non-fiction
- Publisher: University of Chicago Press
- Publication date: 1971
- Publication place: United States
- ISBN: 0-226-41527-9

Foundations of Cyclopean Perception (ISBN 0-226-41527-9) is a book by Bela Julesz, published in 1971.

The Millennium Project ranked it at #57 on a list of the 100 most influential books in cognitive science in the 20th century.
