= Vectograph =

Type of stereoscopic print or transparency

A vectograph is a type of stereoscopic print or transparency viewed by using the polarized 3D glasses most commonly associated with projected 3D motion pictures.

== History ==
Credit for the concept of the vectograph is due to Joseph Mahler, cousin of composer and conductor Gustav Mahler. He immigrated to the US from Czechoslovakia in 1938 and was hired by the Polaroid Corporation, where he worked with its founder Edwin Land, to develop his idea into a practical process.

A vectograph is a polarizing filter with areas that polarize light more or less strongly, corresponding to the darker and lighter areas of the image. When the sheet is viewed in ordinary light, a pale image is visible. When viewed through a uniformly polarizing filter sheet oriented in the same plane of polarization, the image is almost completely invisible. If either sheet is rotated 90 degrees about its axis, so that their planes of polarization are at right angles, the image becomes boldly visible.

If two such images, made to polarize in opposite directions and each encoding one of the images of a stereoscopic pair, are superimposed and viewed through glasses containing appropriately oriented polarizing filters, each eye sees only one of the images and a single three-dimensional image is perceived by people with normal stereoscopic vision.

Vectographs in their native form are transparencies, to be viewed by transmitted light or projected onto a suitable non-depolarizing screen, but by limiting the density of the images and backing the vectograph with a non-depolarizing aluminum-based paint, a print for viewing by reflected light can be produced.

Vectographic prints and transparencies can serve many of the same purposes as their anaglyph equivalents, but with the visual advantage that they do not require the use of viewing filters which are of disturbingly different colors for each eye. However, while anaglyph images can be produced by virtually any photographic or mechanical printing process capable of producing a two-colored image, vectographic images require specialized materials and printing technologies, limiting their practical application.

During World War II, stereoscopic aerial reconnaissance photographs were printed in the form of vectographs, both as reflective prints for use by troops in the field and as transparencies to be projected onto a screen for group viewing and discussion. Instructional use was made of projected vectograph slides illustrating three-dimensional coordinate systems.

Although originally a monochrome "black-and-white" process only, experimental full-color vectographs were soon being made by Polaroid. During the 3D fad of 1953, vectographic 3D color motion picture prints that could be shown with ordinary unmodified projectors were expected to be a commercial reality, but the rapid waning of public enthusiasm for 3D discouraged those efforts. The original full-color process was apparently never put to any commercial use.

Circa 2000, the Rowland Institute, once part of Polaroid and now part of Harvard University, introduced a modernized ink jet printer version of the technology under the name "StereoJet". A color vectograph printing service for digital images was offered, but was expensive and is no longer available.

The most common vectographs, if any examples of the process may be called common, are those in the booklets of "Ortho-Fusor" stereoscopic eye exercises first issued by Bausch and Lomb in the 1940s and available for many years. Also relatively common is the Titmus Fly Stereotest, a greatly enlarged stereoscopic image of a fly used by optometrists and ophthalmologists to determine if patients, especially young children, have normal stereoscopic vision. Currently available vectographic vision training aids, marketed under the registered trademark name "Vectogram", include a variety with the left-eye and right-eye images overlaid on separate transparent plastic sheets so as to be adjustable. Subjects include a quoits hoop, a spirangle, and a hyperstereoscopic view of the Chicago skyline.
