= Binocular vision =

Type of vision

In visual science, binocular vision focuses on visual perception with two eyes instead of one. Two main areas are directional vision and depth perception (stereopsis). Both eyes can positively or negatively influence each other's vision through binocular interaction.

In medical science, binocular vision refers to binocular vision disorders and tests and exercises to improve binocular vision. In biology, binocular vision refers to the placement of the eyes and its effects on the capabilities of depth perception and directional vision in animals. In society, binocular vision refers to applications for seeing stereoscopic images and aids for binocular vision.

== Directional vision ==
In the classical science of vision, directional vision describes; when a point of the retina is stimulated, this not only leads to a light sensation (image), but also a directional sensation; this is recorded by the brain in a combined image of both eyes, as a direction in which the observer is central (egocentric direction).

== Depth vision ==
Depth perception focuses on how the brain uses the difference in perspective, between the two eyes; and how the brain uses it to recognize shapes and objects, see through camouflage and gather information about spatial relationships.

The main article on stereopsis discusses the qualities of depth perception, the area of space they cover, and how the observer controls the input through attention and eye movements.

== Binocular interaction ==
Binocular interaction is interaction between the vision received from the two eyes, which causes vision with both eyes to be different from vision with one eye alone. Vision can be better (binocular summation) or worse (binocular inhibition).

=== Binocular summation ===
In binocular summation, the signals from both eyes reinforce each other so that visual acuity, contrast sensitivity, flicker sensitivity, and brightness sensitivity improve. Maximum binocular summation occurs when the sensitivities of each eye are equal. Differences in sensitivity decrease the effect of binocular summation. The effect of binocular summation decreases with age.

=== Binocular inhibition ===
In binocular inhibition, vision with both eyes is worse than with one eye. This can occur with strabismus or a lazy eye, because the weaker eye interferes with the stronger one. Eye dominance, where the image produced by one eye in the brain can suppress the other, is a form of binocular inhibition.

== Perception systems ==
Information processing for direction perception and depth perception takes place in two systems. One system specializes in color and fine detail and is concerned with discovering shapes and objects in a relatively static environment. The other system specializes in discovering spatial relationships in a rapidly changing environment. The first system contributes to the perception of fused images with fine depth information. The second system contributes to the perception of double images that quickly cover large distances in space and in which the coarse location is the most important information.

== Disorders and tests ==
Around 93% of adults under the age of 60 are estimated to have functional stereoscopic vision (stereopsis) - which means they can perceive depth. But not all can do so equally well. However, about 7% are stereoblind - which means they cannot perceive depth at all. Several tests can determine how well someone sees depth, and there are exercises to improve depth perception. If one eye does not function properly or is blind, this can cause stereoblindness, a complete lack of depth perception. There are other eye disorders that can affect binocular vision. For example, sometimes the eye muscles do not work properly, causing the images from both eyes to be misaligned. Another example is where one eye is dominant, so that the signals from the other eye do not come through in the binocular image, or so that the direction in which an object is seen changes. If eye dominance is noticed in time, an attempt can be made to reduce it through exercise, for example, by temporarily taping the dominant eye.

=== Prevalence ===
Binocular vision abnormalities are among the most common visual disorders. They are usually accompanied by symptoms such as headache, eye strain, eye pain, blurred vision, and occasionally diplopia (double vision). Approximately 20% of patients who come to an optometry clinic have binocular vision defects. As the use of digital aids becomes more common, many children use them for a significant period of time. This can lead to various binocular vision defects, such as reduced accommodative amplitudes, accommodative powers, and positive fusional convergence, both near and far. The most effective way to diagnose visual defects is with the near point of convergence (NPC) test. During the NPC test, a target, such as a finger, is brought to the face until the examiner notices that one eye is turned outward and/or the person has experienced double vision. Binocular defects can be compensated for to some extent by adaptations of the visual system. However, if the deviations of binocular vision are too great (for example, if the visual system has to adapt to excessive horizontal, vertical, torsional or size (aniseikonic) deviations), the eyes tend to avoid binocular vision, which eventually causes or worsens squint.

=== Lazy eye ===
Lazy eye or amblyopia is a neurovisual developmental disorder. The condition is characterized by underdevelopment of several visual features and skills such as visual acuity, eye movements, eye teamwork and binocular depth perception.

=== Squint ===
Squint or strabismus is an eye condition in which the eyes do not look in the same direction.

It has long been known that full binocular vision, including stereopsis, is an important factor in stabilizing the postoperative outcome of strabismus corrections. Many people with a lack of stereopsis have (or had) visible strabismus, which has a potential socioeconomic impact on children and adults. Both wide-angle and narrow-angle strabismus, in particular, can negatively impact self-confidence because it disrupts normal eye contact, often leading to embarrassment, anger, and feelings of discomfort (see psychosocial effects of strabismus).

=== Aniseikonia ===
Aniseikonia is an ocular condition where there is a significant difference in the size of the retinal images of the two eyes caused by differences in refraction between the eyes.

=== Stereopsis tests ===
In stereopsis testing (abbreviated to stereotesting), stereograms are used to measure the presence and sharpness of binocular depth perception (stereopsis).

There are two types of common clinical tests: random-dot stereotesting and contour stereotesting. Random-dot stereotesting uses images of stereo figures embedded in a background of random dots. Contour stereo tests use images in which the targets presented to each eye are separated horizontally.

==== Random-dot stereo tests ====
Stereopsis ability can be tested with the Lang stereotest. It consists of a random-dot stereogram on which a series of parallel strips cylindrical lenses are printed in certain shapes, which represent the images which each eye sees in these areas, separate from each other, similar to a hologram. Without stereopsis, the image appears as a field of random dots, but the shapes become visible with increasing stereopsis and generally consist of a cat (indicating that a stereopsis of 1200 arc seconds of retinal disparity is possible), a star (600 arc seconds), and a car (550 arc seconds). To standardize the results, the image should be viewed at a distance of 40 cm from the eye and exactly in the frontoparallel plane. While most random-dot stereotests, such as the Random Dot "E" stereotest or the TNO stereotest, require special glasses (i.e., polarized or red-green lenses), the Lang stereotest works without special glasses, making it easier to use with young children.

==== Contour stereotests ====
Examples of contour stereotests include the Titmus stereotests, of which the Titmus fly stereotest is the best-known example, in which an image of a fly is shown with deviations at the edges. The patient uses 3D glasses to look at the image and determine whether a 3D figure can be seen. The degree of deviation in the images varies, for example, 400-100 arc seconds and 800-40 arc seconds.

=== Vision therapy ===
Vision therapy is a controversial treatment to improve stereopsis. There have been cases of spontaneous unexpected stereopsis improvements, e.g. by watching a 3D movie in the cinema, and by doing so, permanently enhancing the stereo perception for an individual.

=== Other disorders ===
To maintain stereopsis and singleness of vision, the eyes need to be pointed accurately. The position of each eye is controlled by six extraocular muscles. Slight differences in length, insertion position, or strength of the same muscles in the two eyes can lead to a tendency for one eye to drift to a different position in its orbit from the other, especially when one is tired. This is known as phoria. One way to reveal it is with the cover-uncover test. In this test, one of a person's eyes is covered. With the uncovered eye, the person looks at a target such as a fingertip. The target is moved around to break the reflex that normally holds the covered eye in the correct vergence position. The target is held steady before the eye is uncovered. The eye may flick quickly from being wall-eyed or cross-eyed to its correct position. If the eye moved from out to in, the person has esophoria. If it moved from in to out, the person has exophoria. If the eye did not move at all, the person has orthophoria. Most people have some amount of exophoria or esophoria, which is normal. If the uncovered eye also moved vertically, the person has hyperphoria (if the eye moved from down to up) or hypophoria (if the eye moved from up to down). Such vertical phorias are quite rare. It is also possible for the covered eye to rotate in its orbit, known as cyclophoria, which is rarer than vertical phorias. The cover-uncover test may be used to determine the direction of deviation in cyclophorias.

The cover-uncover test can also be used for more problematic disorders of binocular vision, the tropias. In the cover part of the test, the examiner looks at the first eye while covering the second. If the eye moves from in to out, the person has exotropia. If it moved from out to in, the person has esotropia. People with exotropia or esotropia are wall-eyed or cross-eyed, respectively. These are forms of strabismus that can be accompanied by amblyopia. There are numerous definitions of amblyopia. A definition that incorporates all of these defines amblyopia as a unilateral condition in which vision is worse than 20/20 in the absence of any obvious structural or pathologic anomalies, but with one or more of the following conditions occurring before the age of six: amblyogenic anisometropia, constant unilateral esotropia or exotropia, amblyogenic bilateral isometropia, amblyogenic unilateral or bilateral astigmatism, image degradation. When the covered eye is the non-amblyopic eye, the amblyopic eye suddenly becomes the person's only means of seeing. The strabismus is revealed by the movement of that eye to fixate on the examiner's finger. There are also vertical tropias (hypertropia and hypotropia) and cyclotropias.

Binocular vision anomalies include diplopia, visual confusion (the perception of two different images superimposed onto the same space), suppression (where the brain ignores all or part of one eye's visual field), horror fusionis (an active avoidance of fusion by eye misalignment), and anomalous retinal correspondence (where the brain associates the fovea of one eye with an extrafoveal area of the other eye).

== In animals ==
Vision provides animals with the means to orient themselves in space, to recognize and manipulate objects, and to navigate. In The Ecology of Vision, James Gibson describes how these means have developed in an interactive interplay between observer and environment, and how the environment often contains much more practically useful information than we realize. For example, pilots, as well as fast-moving birds, rely solely on (monocular) motion vision to steer and avoid objects in a rapidly changing environment. In humans, this even leads to a (monocular) 3D sensation of stereopsis. Binocular depth perception (stereopsis) adds to this the notion that the 3D sensation is also available in situations where the observer is not moving quickly. This allows animals to wait for prey while stationary and strike when it is within reach.

=== Predictor of binocular depth perception ===
Whether animals possess the ability for binocular depth perception is not self-evident. First, eye position is a predictor of binocular depth perception. Binocular depth perception requires overlap between the visual fields of both eyes, but this is not a sufficient condition. For example, some birds are known to have a small overlap of visual fields when looking straight ahead, but this is used to steer effectively during rapid flight movements based on motion vision. This illustrates that having an animal's eyes at the front does not automatically mean it possesses binocular depth perception. The type of eye movements is also a predictor of binocular depth perception, but it is also not a sufficient condition. Under prevalence of stereopsis in animals it is indicated in which animals stereopsis has been found.

=== Eye position ===
The field of view of a pigeon compared to that of an owl

Some animals – usually prey – have their two eyes positioned on opposite sides of their heads to give the widest possible field of view. Examples include rabbits, buffalo, and antelopes. In such animals, the eyes often move independently to increase the field of view. Even without moving their eyes, some birds have a 360-degree field of view. Some other animals – usually predators – have their two eyes positioned on the front of their heads, thereby allowing for binocular vision and reducing their field of view in favor of stereopsis. However, front-facing eyes are a highly evolved trait in vertebrates, and there are only three extant groups of vertebrates with truly forward-facing eyes: primates, carnivorous mammals, and birds of prey. Some predatory animals, particularly large ones such as sperm whales and killer whales, have their two eyes positioned on opposite sides of their heads, although it is possible they have some binocular visual field. Other animals that are not necessarily predators, such as fruit bats and a number of primates, also have forward-facing eyes. These are usually animals that need fine depth discrimination/perception; for instance, binocular vision improves the ability to pick a chosen fruit or to find and grasp a particular branch. In animals with forward-facing eyes, the eyes usually move together.

=== Eye movements ===
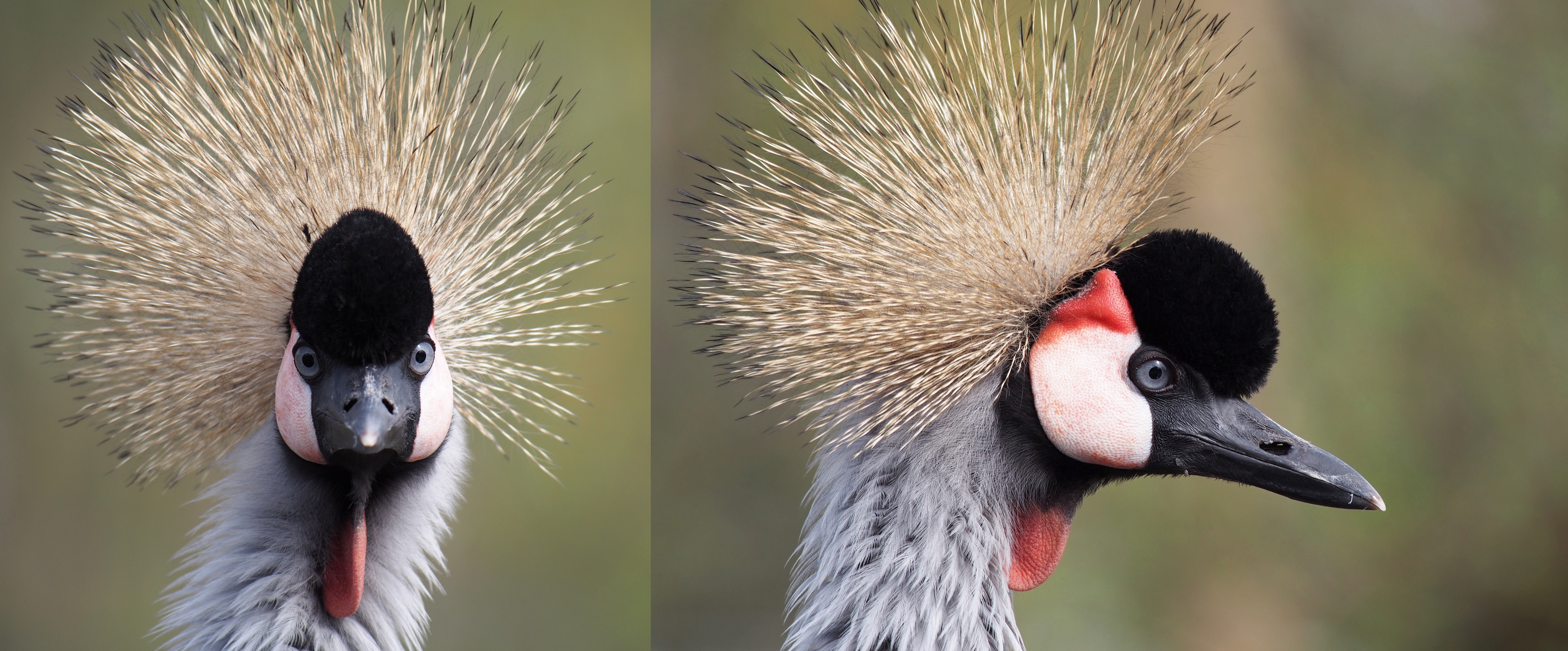
The grey crowned crane, an animal that has laterally-placed eyes which can also face forward

Eye movements are either conjunctive (same direction) version eye movements, usually described by their type (saccades or smooth pursuit), or they are disjunctive (opposite direction) vergence eye movements. Some animals use both of the above strategies. A starling, for example, has laterally placed eyes to cover a wide field of view, but can also move them together to point to the front, so their fields overlap, giving stereopsis. A remarkable example is the chameleon, whose eyes appear as if mounted on turrets, each moving independently of the other, up or down, left or right. Nevertheless, the chameleon can bring both of its eyes to bear on a single object when it is hunting, showing vergence and stereopsis.

=== Birds ===
The function of two eyes seems to vary greatly between bird species. In most birds, binocular vision seems to be primarily focused on being able to control the direction of flight and being able to determine the moment at which an object will be collided: when landing or when pecking. The optical flow is important for controlling the direction of flight, which can be determined by each eye separately. Binocular overlap in that case is functional for being able to fly straight ahead, and does not necessarily indicate the ability to perceive depth. Binocular depth perception is functional in birds that use tools, such as crows. It is also functional for birds that wait still until prey is within pecking range so that they can strike at the right moment. In birds that catch their prey in the air, this area is located higher, at the point where the prey is grasped. These birds have a small binocular field of view that is focused on the area below the beak and/or near the legs, with a blind spot in the area directly below the beak. The absence of vergence eye movements means that birds cannot move the area of stereopsis, if any, in space as humans can.

=== Prevalence of stereopsis ===
Stereopsis has been found in many vertebrates including mammals such as horses, birds such as falcons and owls, reptiles, amphibia including toads and fish. It has also been found in invertebrates including cephalopods like the cuttlefish, crustaceans, spiders, and insects such as mantis. Stomatopods even have stereopsis with just one eye.

=== Interocular distance ===
Interocular distance, also known as pupillary or interpupillary distance, is the distance between the eyes. This separation determines the range of distances over which an animal can perceive depth.

== Applications ==
Applications for binocular vision are aids for binocular vision, aimed at making, recording, and viewing stereo images.

The binocular microscope and binoculars can magnify images. By increasing the distance between the front lenses of the binoculars and decreasing the distance of the front lenses of the microscope, the perceived depth is in proportion to the magnification. In the course of history, various types of stereoscopes have been developed with which specially prepared stereo recordings (stereograms) can be viewed in 3D, both at home and in the cinema. A development which most recently gained popularity are Virtual Reality (VR) glasses - which however have already a long history - with one of the pioneering developments being Ivan Sutherland's Sword of Damocles.

=== Binocular viewers ===
The observable three-dimensional space can be seemingly enlarged with a binocular telescope for things that are far away and a binocular microscope for very small things. It is not self-evident that by enlarging the image, depth is also seen. This is explained below.

==== Binoculars ====
With binoculars, the world that we know up close can also be viewed from a distance. The optics in the binoculars ensure that the retinal images are enlarged. The perceived depth is reduced, the image appears flatter. In order to restore the normal aspect ratio, binocular binoculars must be used to view from two points that are further apart than the two eyes. In binocular binoculars, the front lenses are therefore placed further apart using optical means (prisms or mirrors). The enlargement of the depth dimension that can be achieved in this way is practically limited to the area in which stereopsis is possible. At greater depth (disparity), the image appears flat. For a natural depth experience, it is important that the distance between the two lenses is adjusted to the magnification factor of the binoculars.

==== Microscope ====
A binocular microscope can be used to magnify and view a microscopic world. In order to see depth in this small world that is in proportion to the size of the objects present, the distance between the front lenses of the microscope must be much smaller than the normal distance between our eyes. This is done with the same optical means as with binocular binoculars, but then in a mirrored arrangement, see figure.

==== Without depth ====
Even without seeing depth, binocular vision has advantages over seeing with one eye. If care is taken to ensure that the images from both eyes overlap well and are sharp, then the images from both eyes reinforce each other (binocular summation) and it is as if the image is brighter. This can be compared to increasing the light intensity by using larger lenses.

=== Stereo images ===
Binocular images can be captured by recording both the image seen by the left eye and the image seen by the right eye in a stereogram. The images can be recorded simultaneously (stereo photography) or one after the other (Reconnaissance stereogram, moon stereogram). The advantage of recording the images of the left and right eyes simultaneously with a stereo camera is that no false disparities arise because the scene to be recorded has changed between the recordings.

==== Stereogram ====
A stereogram is a set of two images (pictures, videos, or computer-generated images), one for each eye, that can be used to evoke a binocular three-dimensional scene.

In a stereogram, the two images can be attached to each other, with the left-eye image on the left and the right-eye image on the right (L-R stereogram), or with the right-eye image on the left and the left-eye image on the right (R-L stereogram). A stereogram can also consist of two separate images that are placed separately in a stereoscope, or that are specially prepared and placed on top of each other, with color filters, polarizing filters, or optical ridges used to ensure that each eye sees only one of the images.

Stereograms have been and continue to be widely used in depth perception research, for entertainment, and for education.

Stereograms can be made by hand, by drawing with a computer program, or by taking pictures with one or two still cameras (stereo camera) or video cameras. The geometry used to design the correct disparities for these images is described in epipolar geometry and computer stereo vision.

For natural scenes, the recordings for a stereogram are usually made from observation positions that are as far apart as the distance between the two eyes. In macro photography, this distance must be smaller to obtain a natural depth effect, and in a Reconnaissance stereogram it must be larger. Another special stereogram is based on the movement of the moon relative to the sun (moon stereogram).

A large number of stereograms are special because they represent a certain cultural period, a certain application or technique, or an important step in the research into binocular vision. The following stereograms belong to the latter category. Examples of more can be found on the Internet.

==== Line stereogram ====
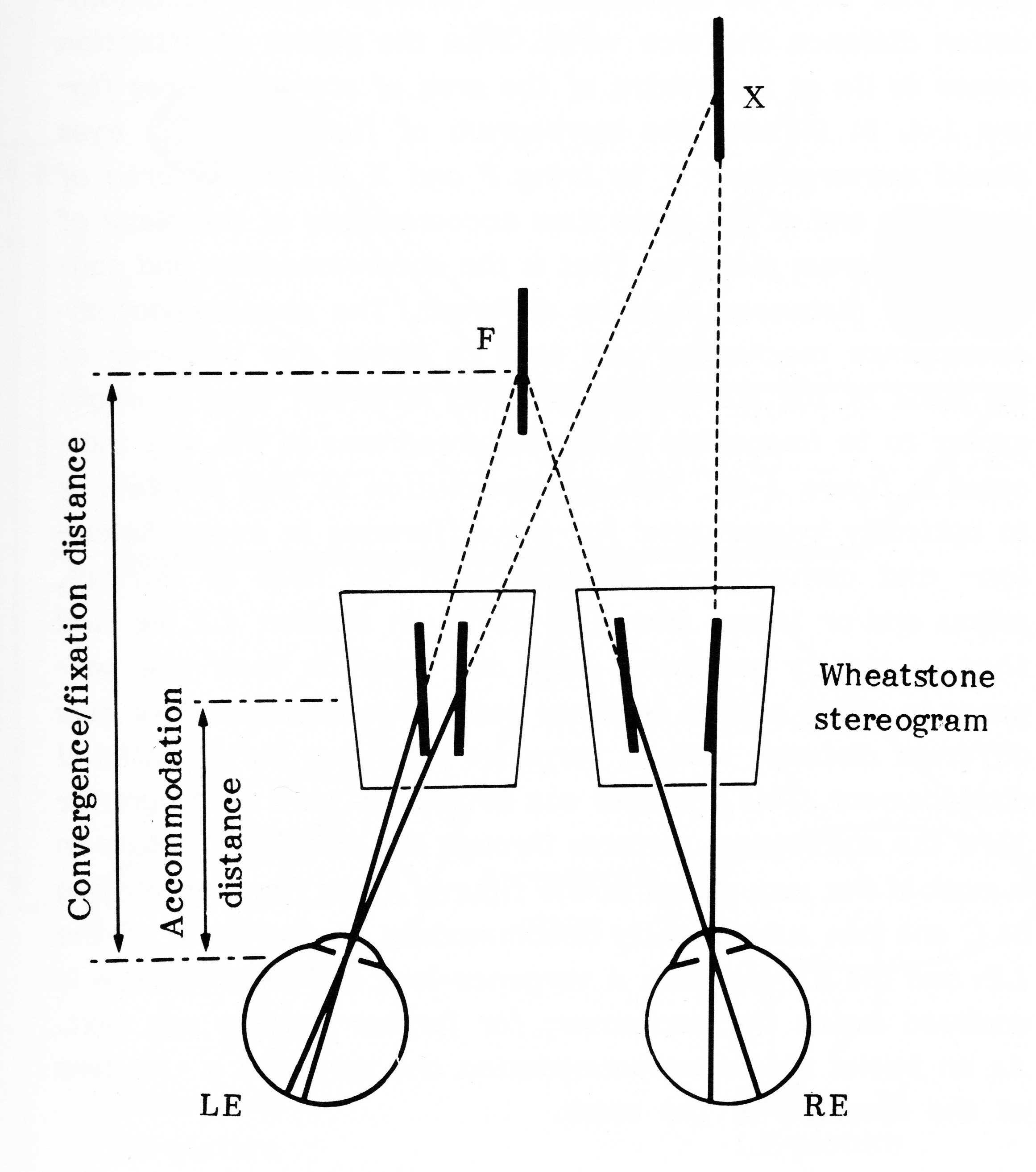
Line stereogram

A line stereogram is a drawn stereogram. The first stereogram was a line stereogram used by Charles Wheatstone in 1838 to show that binocular depth is caused by binocular disparity. This type of stereogram has been widely used for research ever since, and is still used for this purpose.

==== Moon stereogram ====
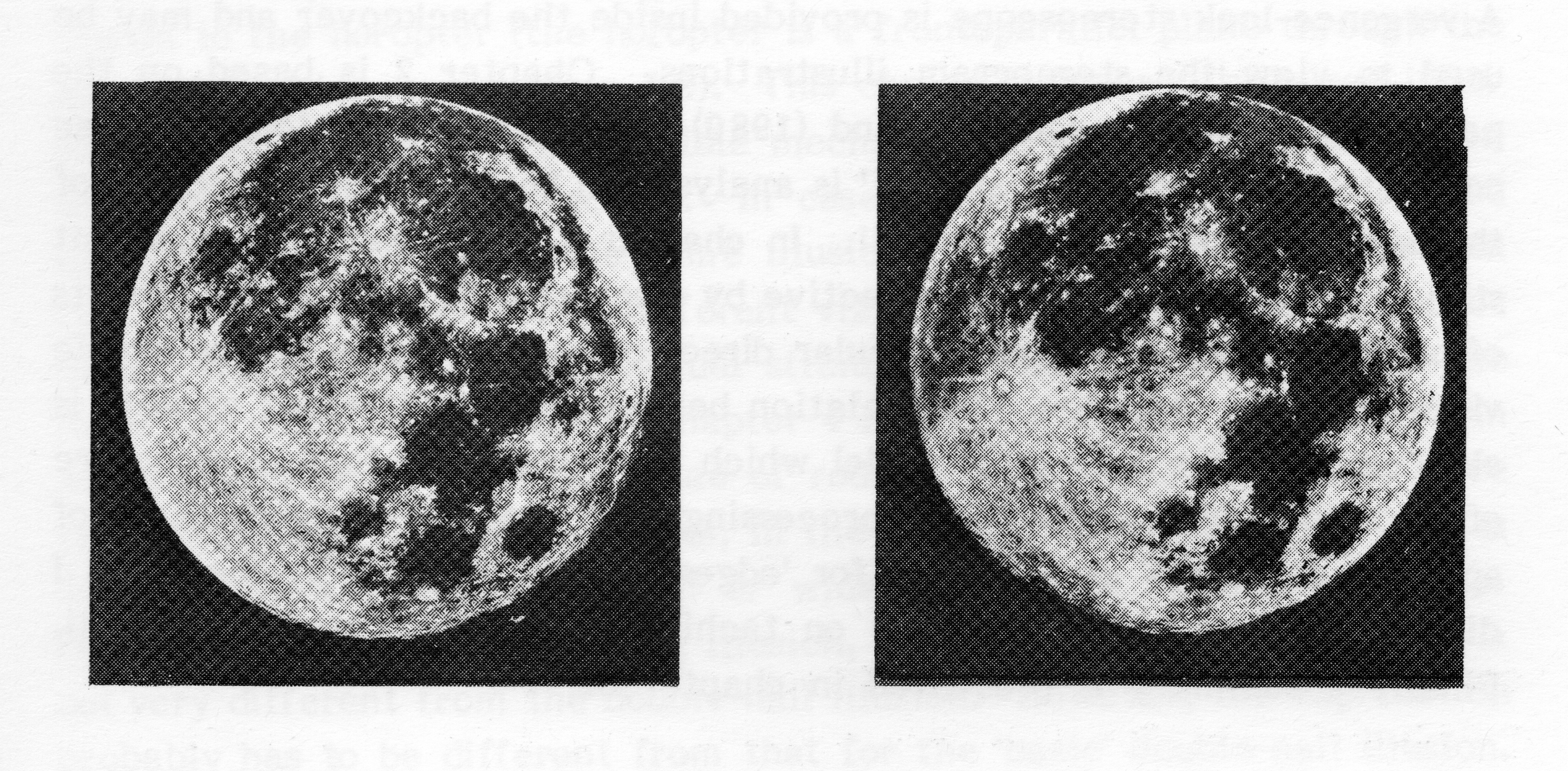
Moon stereogram. Photographs taken on September 15 and November 13, 1864, by Rutherford. View with crossed eyes

Whipple conceived in 1860 of taking a photograph of the moon on two different days and viewing the photographs in a stereoscope. In the stereoscope, the wobbling of the moon (lunar libration) and the shifting of the shadows make the mountains and craters clearly visible in the depths. (Krol, 1982, p. 2-3). This stereogram illustrates that there are many ways in which disparities can arise, not only through the parallax of our two eyes.

==== Reconnaissance stereogram ====
Stereograms have been used since World War I during reconnaissance flights. During the flight, photographs of the terrain are taken at regular time intervals. Consecutive photos are viewed in pairs in a stereoscope. Camouflaged objects can now be clearly seen in depth. This reconnaissance (or scouting) stereogram illustrates that a stereogram can also be made with one camera, and that binocular depth perception helps to see through camouflage.

==== Random dot stereogram ====
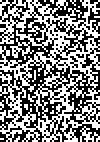
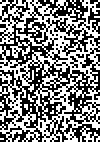

In a random dot stereogram the left and right images consist of dots that are randomly white and black. Dots that lie within a certain (invisible) shape in the left image, for example, a triangle, also appear in the right image, but are shifted by 1 or more pixels. If the stereogram is viewed with both eyes, the shape becomes visible due to the difference in depth with the surrounding dots. This shows, among other things, that depth perception precedes seeing shapes (Julesz, 1960).

==== Stereotesting ====
Medical professionals use several types of stereograms to test whether someone has depth perception or is stereoblind, and how accurate their depth perception is.

=== Stereoscopy ===
When viewing the recorded or generated images, care must be taken to ensure that each eye sees only the image that was recorded for each eye. This can be done with many different techniques. These techniques ensure that the eyes can focus on the physical distance of the stereo image, and at the same time converge on the corresponding point in space. In doing so, the observer must sometimes learn to overcome conflicts between both reflexes (vergence-accommodation conflict). Nowadays, stereograms are often offered via VR glasses.

==== Vergence-accommodation conflict ====
When looking around in a natural 3D environment, the eyes fixate on different spatial points in succession. The eyes automatically focus and converge on the fixated point. When looking at a stereogram, the eyes must focus on the distance of the images and not on the distance of the fixation point. The vergence point must also move with the fixation point to ensure that the area for stereopsis is around the fixation point. This means that the vergence and accommodation reflexes must be decoupled. This can be trained, but can cause eye strain or headaches in the beginning.

==== Stereoscope ====
A stereoscope is a tool to be able to offer the two images of a stereogram separately and sharply to both eyes and at a different distance than where the eyes converge. Different stereoscopes are suitable for different types of stereograms. There are different types of stereoscopes, based on lenses, mirrors, prisms, color filters and polaroid filters. The first stereoscope was invented by Wheatstone in 1838.

Greater depth experience. To increase the sense of depth, the left and right images of stereo photographs are sometimes placed slightly further apart than they should be for a realistic image. The explanation for the greater sense of depth at a greater convergence distance is that the eyes have to look slightly farther away (converge) than is appropriate for the original situation and the monocular perspective in the images. The brain "corrects" this by perceiving objects as larger and with more depth. A similar mechanism underlies the explanation of pseudocopy.

==== Pseudoscopy ====
Pseudoscopy is viewing a stereogram of a natural scene in which the images for both eyes have been swapped. This reverses the binocular depth (disparity), convex becomes concave, and vice versa. The monocular perspective is unchanged, and therefore conflicts with the binocular depth information. This results in nearby objects appearing larger than normal and more distant objects appearing smaller. This gives a surreal feeling.

==== Vergence-Lock Stereoscope ====
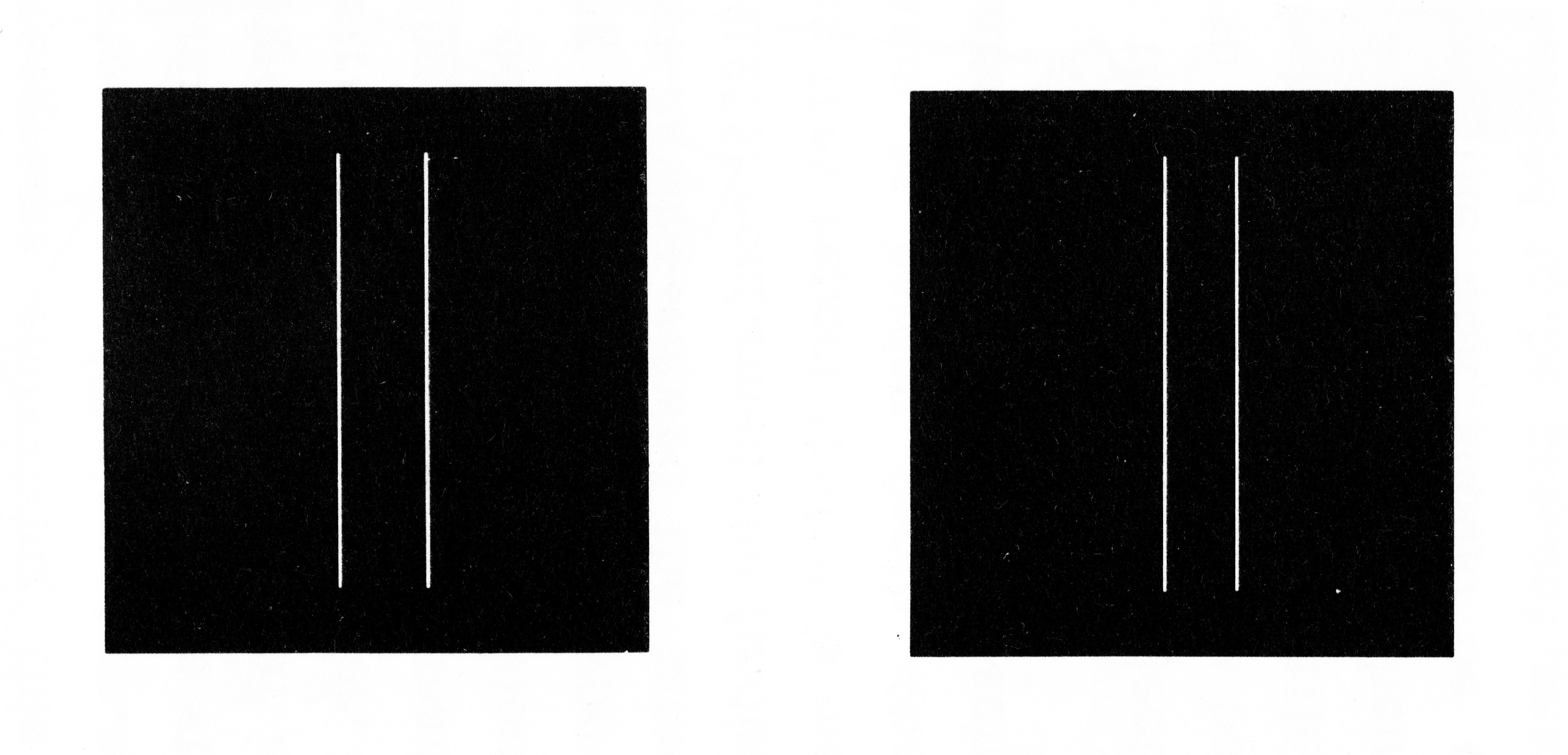
Line stereogram that can be viewed with crossed eye directions

The two images of a two-view stereogram can, with some practice, be viewed without a stereoscope. A common way of doing this is with a stereogram in which the image for the left eye is on the right and the image for the right eye is on the left (R-L stereogram).

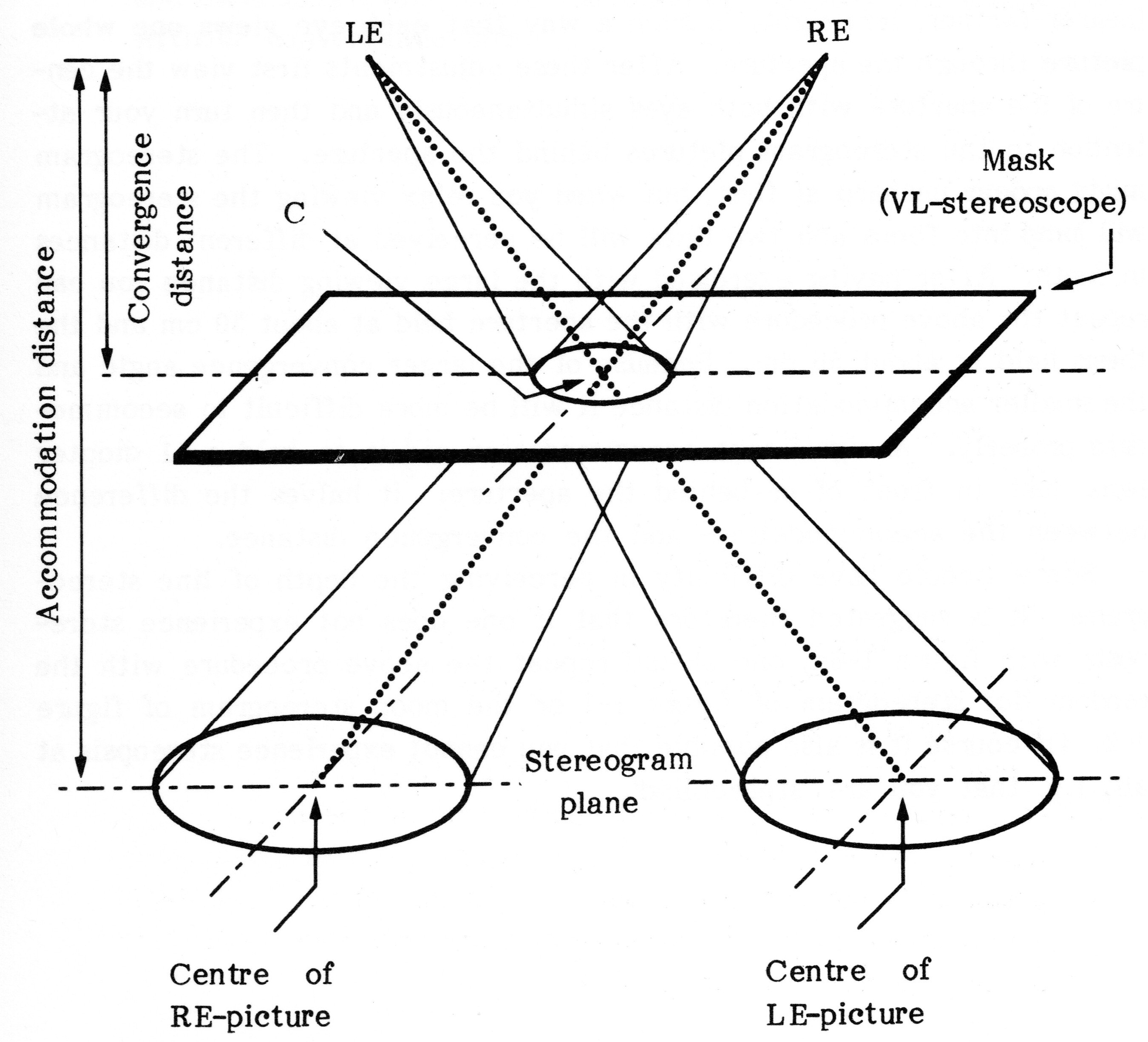
Vergence-Lock Stereoscope

One method is to cross the eye axes at a point in front of the stereogram in such a way that the left eye looks at the center of the right image and the right eye looks at the center of the left image. It helps to hold the point of a pencil at the intersection and focus attention on this point, and then wait until the image becomes sharp and depth is perceived.

Krol (1982, p. 16-17) uses a piece of cardboard with a round or square recess instead of a pencil. This allows each eye to only see its own image. Moreover, the hole helps to automatically converge correctly.

== History ==
Alhazen (Ibn al-Haytham), an Arab scholar from the 11th century, was the first to propose that vision is possible because light reflects off objects and then enters the eye after which perceptions arise in the brain that are partly the result of activities of the observer, such as directing the eyes. He also conducted experiments using equal scripts on equal paper strips to demonstrate that binocular vision is clearest where the two visual axes meet. In the 19th century, this idea was elaborated by Ewald Hering. He assumed that each eye saw direction (visual direction) and introduced the idea of a "cyclopean eye" for egocentric direction, as if we saw the world from a single central point between both eyes. Combined with the results of research on the horopter this can explain single and double images. The explanation of sensory fusion, in which two double images merge into one new image with a new direction, was only possible when nerve cells were found in the brain that become active when a specific direction is stimulated simultaneously in the left and right eyes. The perception of depth based on differences in the directions between both eyes (disparity) is discussed in a separate article, Stereopis.

=== Egocentric direction ===
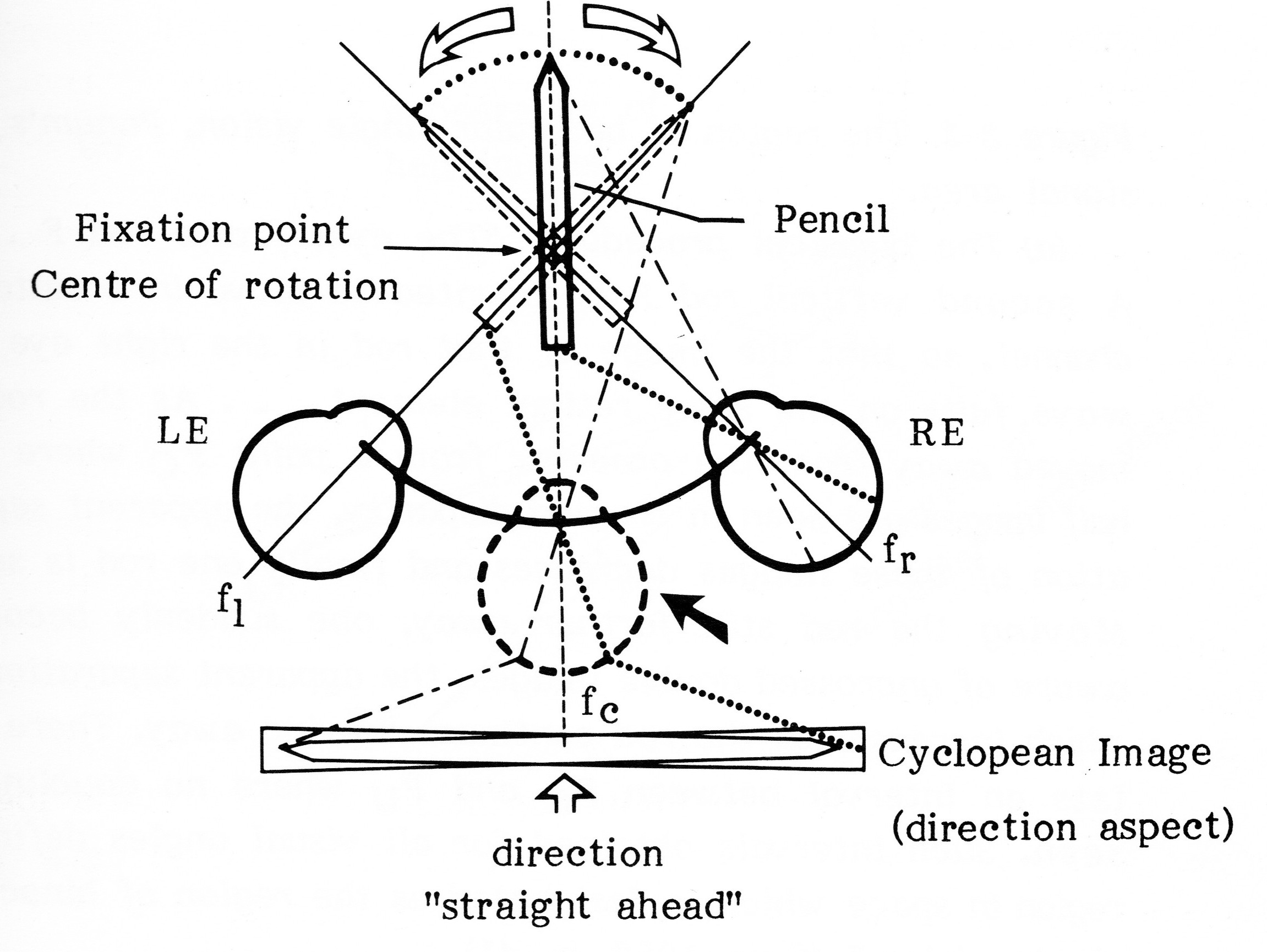
Cyclopian projection. Rotate the left eye (LE) and the right eye (RE) around the fixation point

Hering described in 1861 that we seem to perceive the world from a point, midway between both eyes, instead of from each eye separately. He called this point a cyclopean eye, after the cyplopes in Greek mythology. Hering also described a method to show how the two retinal images in this cyclopean eye are apparently merged into a combined image. He called this method cyclopean projection. He illustrated this method with a pencil held so that it points away from the observer, see the figure. The method basically involves rotating the images of the two eyes around the fixation point towards each other until they coincide in the cyclopean eye. Geometrically this does not change the direction, but it does give a concise description of how we seem to see directions. This is also called Hering's law of common binocular direction.

=== Horopter ===
Geometric horopter. The visual directions of point P coincide on the horopter (single vision) and are equal: α = β

Hering's Cyclopean projection is intended as a description of what he observed and not as an explanation of how the egocentric image is formed in the brain. How the images from the two eyes are merged has been extensively investigated using a theoretical model, the geometric horopter. The geometric horopter is a circle through the fixation point and both eyes. Points on this circle have been shown to project (approximately) onto corresponding points in both eyes. These are points that look in the same visual direction in both eyes. In empirical research it has been established that it is possible to measure and compare the visual directions in both eyes and thus determine the observed horopter (empirical horopter). It turns out that this horopter is not a line but a vertical (frontoparallel) plane through the fixation point and that the shape of this plane differs per person. At short fixation distances the plane as seen from the observer is concave (hollow), at slightly greater distances flatter and at greater distances flat or convex. Furthermore, the plane curves towards the observer at the top and away from the observer at the bottom. It is generally assumed that these are adaptations to the environment, including how the eyes move in the recesses in the skull.

=== Sensory fusion ===
Panum's fusion area according to Ogle. In this area objects are seen single, outside of it double

Observational research shows that points with unequal visual directions in both eyes are sometimes not seen double, but single, in a direction that lies between the two visual directions. This phenomenon is called sensory fusion. With a strong dominant eye, the perceived direction of the fused image is closer to the direction seen by the dominant eye.

=== Hering's experiment ===
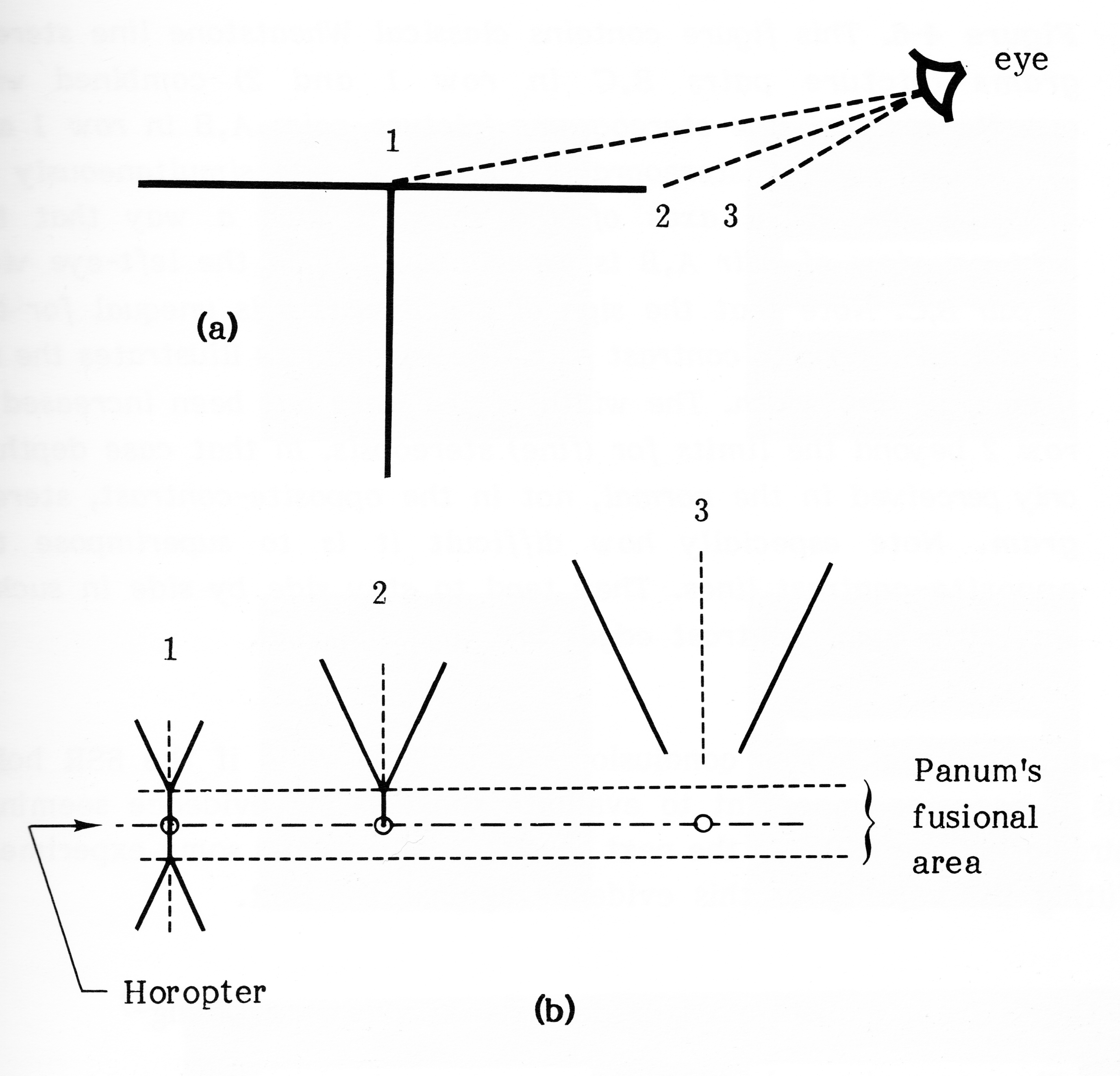
Hering's midsagittal rod

Hering described an experiment to test Panum's theory. In the experiment, a thin rod is held straight ahead in the direction of view in the midsagittal plane. If the center of the rod is fixed, then the center of the rod should appear single and the ends double and receding in depth, as in the figure. Hering did not find this and thus rejected the theory.

Hering's experiment is a special case of the midsagittal-strip illusion. This illusion explains that and why the fused image is seen transversely to the direction of view and not as Hering assumed.

=== Vergence horopter ===
As soon as a point that has the attention threatens to move outside Panum's fusion area, an automatic eye movement (vergence movement) ensures that the point comes to lie in the middle of Panum's fusion area again. In research on this reflex, the vergence horopter is defined as the set of points within Panum's fusion range that do not elicit a reflex. The measured horopter falls centrally within Panum's fusion range. In the vertical plane, the vergence horopter is less inclined than the corresponding fusion range.

=== Explanation ===
The existence of fusion is not explained by classical theory. Theories that make use of the fact that neurons have been found in the visual cortex that look in a specific visual direction via each eye seem to be able to explain this phenomenon better.

== See also ==
- Stereopsis
- Binocular illusions
- Pulfrich Effect
- Ophthalmology

== Bibliography ==
- Julesz, Bela (1971). Foundations of cyclopean perception. University of Chicago Press. ISBN 978-0-226-41527-7.
- Steinman, Scott B. & Steinman, Barbara A. & Garzia, Ralph Philip (2000). Foundations of Binocular Vision: A Clinical perspective. McGraw-Hill Medical. ISBN 0-8385-2670-5.
- Howard, I. P., & Rogers, B. J. (2012). Perceiving in depth. Volume 2, Stereoscopic vision. Oxford: Oxford University Press. ISBN 978-0-19-976415-0
- Cabani, I. (2007). Segmentation et mise en correspondance couleur – Application: étude et conception d'un système de stéréovision couleur pour l'aide à la conduite automobile. ISBN 978-613-1-52103-4
