= Muscular evolution in humans =

Overview of muscular adaptations in humans

Muscular evolution in humans is an overview of the muscular adaptations made by humans from their early ancestors to the modern man. Humans are believed to be predisposed to develop muscle density as early humans depended on muscle structures to hunt and survive. Modern man's need for muscle is not as dire, but muscle development is still just as rapid if not faster due to new muscle building techniques and knowledge of the human body.

== Introduction ==
DNA and anthropologic data consider modern humans (Homo sapiens) a primate and the descendants of ape-like species. Species of the genus ‘Homo’ are all extinct except humans, which are thought to have evolved from australopithecine ancestors originating in East Africa. The development of the modern human has taken place over some 300,000 years and unique adaptations have resulted from ecological pressures that Homo Sapiens has faced. Due prominently to ecological and behavioral factors, the modern human muscular system differs greatly from that of our early primate ancestors. These adaptations and changes have allowed Homo sapiens to function as they do today.

As is the standard for all evolutionary adaptations, the human muscle system evolved in its efforts to increase survivability. Since muscles and the accompanying ligaments and tendons are present all throughout the body aiding in many functions, it is apparent that our behavior and decisions are based upon what we are and how we can operate. It is believed that our ancestor's original habitat was not on the ground but in the trees and we developed new habits that eventually allowed us to thrive on the ground, such as changes in diet, gathering of food, energy expenditure, social interactions, and predators. Life in the canopy meant a food supply similar to that of herbivores: leaves, fruits, berries; mostly low-protein foods that did not require a large amount of energy to find. However, if any could be found, meat was also consumed. At this time our ancestors had not yet switched to full-time bipedalism and so searching for food on the ground did not make sense because there was too much energy and risk involved. This habitat also lacked the predators found on the ground that our chimp-like ancestors would have been poor defenders against. As they became bipedal, they began to live in groups that used weapons to fend off predators and hunt down prey. Running became a key aspect to the survival of the species. Even with all this, it is the development of the brain that has guided the development of the muscle functions and structures in humans.

== Skull, neck, and head ==
It is suspected that H. sapiens ancestors’ did not initially forage on the forest floor; instead they migrated from the trees for various reasons. In that environment, they survived on a diet high in plant matter with some insects and little amounts of meat. They were not very formidable opponents to more dominant mammals such as large ancient cats (lions, leopards) but their ability to be better hunters and gatherers along with their corresponding brain development, gave them the advantage to add high-calorie nutrient supplies such as meat to their diet. Analysis of the jaws and skull of the supposed human ancestors show that they had larger, stronger jaw muscles attached to the skull which would be expected with a diet rich in fruit and plants. The back set of molars were much larger for this reason also. The dependence on these higher-calorie foods came from the inefficiency of bipedalism and the growing energy costs of climbing tall trees. Human ancestors are thought to have had more muscles connecting the skull, neck, and shoulders/back area (similar to apes) which caused their neck and skull regions to appear to sag, such as non-human primate species do. These diminished muscles allow the human head to be held in its current ‘upright’ position and lets the occipitofrontalis muscle, or the forehead, to function as an aid to expressions.

== Upper body/back ==
Humans became taller as the years passed after becoming bipedal which lengthened back muscles at the base of the tail bone and hips which in effect made them weigh more, further hampering their abilities in the trees. Early human ancestors had a tail where modern humans’ tail bone is located. This aided in balance when in the trees but lost its prominence when bipedalism was adapted. The arms also became shorter (opposite in comparison to legs) for carrying objects and using them as multi-tasking agents instead of climbing and swinging in trees. It is well known that the Homo sapiens line of primates developed the opposable thumb which opened the door to many muscle functions not yet possible in the hand and other upper body regions. The stretching muscles of the forearms whose tendons allowed the human to concentrate its force and abilities within his/her hands and fingers contributed to great new abilities. Overall, upper body muscles developed to deal with more activities that involved the concentration of strength in those muscles such as: holding, throwing, lifting, running with something to assist in escaping danger, hunting, and the construction of habitats and shelters.

== Lower body/below waist ==
The conversion to full-time bipedalism in our distant ancestors is the main argument for the adaptations our muscle structure and function have made. By having to center the force of gravity on two feet, the human thigh bone developed an inward slope down to the knee which may have allowed their gluteal abductors to adapt to the stress and build the necessary muscle. This allows the human to manage their balance on a single foot and when “in-stride” during walking. Muscles near the ankle helped provide the push during walking and running. There are many advantages and disadvantages to this altered posture and gait. The ability to grab something with four appendages was lost but what was gained was the ability to hold a club or throw a spear and use the other free hand for another task. This adaptation also helped humans stand up straight with locked knees for longer periods of time. The plantaris muscle in the foot which helped our ancestors grab and manipulate objects like chimps do, has adapted to its new evolutionary role appropriately, becoming so underdeveloped that it cannot grip or grab anything, the foot has grown more elongated as a result and now 9% of humans are born without it. Homo sapiens benefitted by becoming a better defender and hunter. An increase in running as a hunting and survival activity was perhaps fundamental to this development.

== Strength changes ==
Compared to our closest living relatives, chimpanzees and bonobos, Homo sapiens' skeletal muscle is on average about 1.35 to 1.5 times weaker when normalized for size. As little biomechanical difference was found between individual muscle fibers from the different species, this strength difference is likely the result of different muscle fiber type composition. Humans' limb muscles tend to be more biased toward fatigue-resistant, slow twitch Type I muscle fibers. While there is no proof that modern humans have become physically weaker than past generations of humans, inferences from such things as bone robusticity and long bone cortical thickness can be made as a representation of physical strength. Taking such factors into account, there has been a rapid decrease in overall robusticity in those populations that take to sedentism. For instance, bone shaft thickness since the 17th and 18th centuries have decreased in the United States, indicating a less physically stressful life. This is not, however, the case for current hunter gatherer and foraging populations, such as the Andaman Islanders, who retain overall robusticity. In general, though, hunter gatherers tend to be robust in the legs and farmers tend to be robust in the arms, representing different physical load (i.e., walking many miles a day versus grinding wheat).
