= Eccentricity effect =

The eccentricity effect is a visual phenomenon that affects visual search. As retinal eccentricity increases (i.e. the light of the image enters the eye at a larger angle and approaches peripheral vision), the observer is slower and less accurate to detect an item they are searching for.

Visual search tends to be better (faster and more accurate) when the target is presented closest/more centrally to the fovea, and worsens when the target is further in the periphery of the retina.

This effect was first confirmed in research by Carrasco, Evert, Chang, and Katz in 1995, and was replicated by Wolfe, O'Neill and Bennet in 1998.

== Etymology ==
The word eccentric comes from the Greek ekkentros meaning “out of the center”.

== Mechanisms ==
=== Visual explanation ===
When we view an image, light passes through the cornea, and through the pupil, which is controlled by the iris. It then passes through the lens and is projected onto the retina at the back of the eye. In the middle of the retina is the fovea, which contains a high concentration of cones. Cones are responsible for colour vision and have high spatial acuity, whereas rods are not. Rods are instead responsible for vision at lower light. Cones are much more sparsely located in the periphery of the retina, where there is instead a greater concentration of rods. When a central image is projected directly onto the fovea it is sharper and processed with greater speed and accuracy due to these cones, whereas images further in the periphery (greater eccentricity) are processed more slowly and less accurately.

Cortical magnification is one such visual explanation and is referring to the variance of the number of neurons that exist in the visual cortex, which are responsible for processing a visual stimulus. This number of neurons varies according to the location of the stimulus in the visual field. This accounts for the greater spatial acuity at the centre of the fovea compared to that at the periphery, and can sometimes be counteracted through M scaling – where stimulus size is adjusted according to its location.

Staugaard, Petersen and Vangkilda (2016) wanted to see if cortical magnification could explain the eccentricity effect. They adjusted the size of their experiment stimuli according to the cortical magnification factor (through M scaling) and found no effect of cortical magnification which could fully explain the eccentricity effect.

Bao et al. (2013) also tested to see if cortical magnification was responsible for the eccentricity effect of inhibition of return (IOR). Inhibition of return is an orientation mechanism which refers to the “relative suppression of stimuli that had recently been the focus of attention”.[10] An eccentricity effect can also be seen in IOR i.e. there is a stronger IOR effect in the periphery, and Bao et al. wanted to see if cortical magnification was responsible for this. They tested their participants with different sized stimulus at two peripheral locations (scaling for the size of the location) to account for cortical magnification. Their results indicated that scaling of the stimulus size did not change the eccentricity effect of IOR and therefore cortical magnification is not responsible for this.

The results from Staugaard, Petersen and Vangkilda, and Bao et al. suggest that the potential visual explanation of cortical magnification is not an explanation for the eccentricity effect.

=== Attentional explanation ===
Another explanation for the eccentricity effect is that of the guided search model. This model posits that when an individual is carrying out a visual search task, their attention is deployed to one item at a time. The order of this attention depends on the activation of the item – the item receives more activation if it shares similar features with the target. In the case of eccentricity, the item/s that is/are closest to the target i.e. less eccentric, will receive more activation; and items further away i.e. those that have greater eccentricity, will receive less activation, and therefore processing for these will be slower and less accurate.

== Variables influencing the effect ==
=== Target orientation ===
Carrasco, Evert, Chang and Katz (1995) found that for vertical targets there was a more pronounced eccentricity effect than tilted targets, but only for single feature searches. When the search was a conjunction search, i.e. target has more than one feature, there was no difference between tilted versus vertical targets.

=== Display duration ===
Carrasco, Evert, Chang and Katz's 1995 research also included a free-viewing, fixed-viewing and fast-fixed-viewing condition. Free-viewing means that display was present until observers responded; fixed-viewing means that display was only present for 104msec, and finally fast-fixed means that the display was only present for 64msec. They found a main effect for display duration that performance is slower for the free-viewing than fixed-viewing conditions, but that accuracy decreased more in the fast-fixed than fixed viewing condition, while fixed-viewing was marginally less accurate than free-viewing. This indicates a main effect of eccentricity on accuracy across different display duration's, and indicates that the impact of the eccentricity effect on accuracy decreases when observers have longer to respond.

=== Visual search type ===
Carrasco, Evert, Chang and Katz (1995) also found a more pronounced eccentricity effect in conjunction searches (these are targets which are defined by more than one feature), compared to single feature searches. This effect is more pronounced in larger set sizes.

Wolfe, O’Neill and Bennet (1998) attempted to replicate these findings in a similar style conjunction search task, using colour x orientation, with either a single (red and vertical) or two target (red and vertical or green and horizontal) condition. They found eccentricity effects for both the single and two target conditions, of which the effect was larger for the two target condition i.e. performance was slower and less accurate – lending further support to Carrasco, Evert, Chang and Katz's 1995 findings.

=== Set size ===
Carrasco, Evert, Chang and Katz (1995) observed increasing eccentricity effects in larger set sizes throughout their experiments.

Wolfe, O’Neill and Bennet (1998) also investigated the effect of set size x eccentricity. They found that with a set size of 1, the eccentricity effect remained similar at different eccentricities, however when the set size was greater than 1 the eccentricity effect grew for greater eccentricities.
