= Zenon Pylyshyn =

Canadian cognitive scientist (1937–2022)

Zenon Pylyshyn FRSC
- Born: 25 August 1937; Montreal, Quebec, Canada
- Died: 6 December 2022 (aged 85); The Bronx, New York, United States

Philosophical work
- Era: 20th-century philosophy
- Region: Western philosophy
- School: Analytic philosophy; rationalism; cognitivism; functionalism
- Main interests: Vision; cognitive science; information theory
- Notable ideas: Visual indexing theory

Zenon Walter Pylyshyn FRSC (/ˈzɛnən pəˈlɪʃən/; 25 August 1937 – 6 December 2022) was a Canadian cognitive scientist and philosopher. He was a Canada Council Senior Fellow from 1963 to 1964.

Pylyshyn's research generally involved the theoretical analysis of the nature of the human cognitive systems behind perception, imagination, and reasoning. He developed visual indexing theory (sometimes called the FINST theory) which hypothesizes a pre-conceptual mechanism responsible for individuating, tracking, and directly (or demonstratively) referring to the visual objects that could be interrogated by cognitive processes. His very influential multiple object tracking experiment methodology emerged from this work.

Pylyshyn was also a significant voice in the imagery debate in cognitive psychology, which debated whether mental imagery is depictive in nature as Stephen Kosslyn advocated, or propositional as Pylyshyn advocated.

== Early life and education ==
Pylyshyn was born in Montreal, Quebec, Canada, to Ukrainian immigrants Anna and Yuriy. He obtained a degree in Engineering Physics (BEng 1959) from McGill University and in control systems (MSc 1960) and experimental psychology (PhD 1963), both from the Regina Campus, University of Saskatchewan. His dissertation was on the application of information theory to studies of human short-term memory.

== Career ==
Pylyshyn was a Canada Council Senior Fellow from 1963 to 1964. He was then professor of Psychology and Computer Science, at the University of Western Ontario in London, from 1964 until 1994, where he also held honorary positions in Philosophy and Electrical Engineering and was director of the UWO Center for Cognitive Science. From 1985 to 1994, he directed the program in Artificial Intelligence and Robotics at the Canadian Institute for Advanced Research.

In 1991, Pylyshyn joined the Rutgers University Psychology Department. In 1994, he accepted positions as the Board of Governors Professor of Cognitive Science and as the director of the new Rutgers University Center for Cognitive Science in New Brunswick, New Jersey. In May 2016 Rutgers held a one-day "ZenFest", to commemorate his retirement.

== Work ==
=== Mental Imagery ===
Pylyshyn criticized the idea that mental imagery are pictorial in nature. He believed they were propositional, in a language-like format. Pylyshyn believed that the mechanisms of imagistic reasoning are the same as general reasoning and referred to this as the "null-hypothesis".

Pylyshyn disputed Kosslyn et al.'s interpretation of their mental scanning experiment. Kosslyn et al. had subjects memorize a map and then asked them to focus on one landmark in their mental image of the map. They then asked the subject to press a button when they saw a second landmark in their mental map, when prompted. The longer the distance of the second landmark from the first, the more time it took for the subjects to press the button. Pylyshyn argued that this did not indicate that mental images had a metric, spatial property as mental imagery is cognitively penetrable. Pylyshyn and Bannon repeated the experiment and instead asked the subjects to report the compass direction of the second landmark when prompted. This would require first focusing on the second landmark. No relationship between time and distance was found.

== Awards and Honors ==
Pylyshyn was awarded the CPA Donald O. Hebb Award for Distinguished Contributions to Psychology as a Science in 1990. He was awarded the Jean-Nicod Prize and delivered the Jean-Nicod lectures in 2004.

== Death ==
Pylyshyn died, on 6 December 2022, at Calvary Hospital in New York City.

== Selected publications ==
=== Articles ===
- Pylyshyn, Z. W. (1973). "What the Mind's Eye Tells the Mind's Brain". Psychological Bulletin. 80: 1–24. doi:10.1037/h0034650. S2CID 145431092.
- Pylyshyn, Z. W.; Fodor, Jerry (1988). "Connectionism and cognitive architecture: A critical analysis". Cognition. 28 (1–2): 3–71. doi:10.1016/0010-0277(88)90031-5. PMID 2450716. S2CID 29043627.
- Pylyshyn, Z. W. (June 2001). "Visual Indexes, Preconceptual Objects, and Situated Vision" (PDF). Cognition. 80 (1–2): 127–158. doi:10.1016/S0010-0277(00)00156-6. PMID 11245842. S2CID 15474365.

=== Books ===
- Computation and Cognition: Toward a Foundation for Cognitive Science (MIT Press, 1984) ISBN 978-0-262-6605-87
- Meaning and Cognitive Structure: Issues in the Computational Theory of Mind (Ablex Publishing, 1986) ISBN 978-0-893-9137-24
- The Robot's Dilemma: The Frame Problem in Artificial Intelligence (1987), Ablex Publishing, 1987) ISBN 0-893-9137-15
- Perspectives on the Computer Revolution (with Liam J. Bannon, Intellect 1988) ISBN 978-0-893-9136-94
- Computational Processes in Human Vision: An Interdisciplinary Perspective (ed. Zenon Pylyshyn, Intellect, 1988) ISBN 978-0-893-9146-08
- The Robot's Dilemma Revisited (ed. Zenon Pylyshyn, with K. M. Ford, Ablex, 1996) ISBN 978-1-567-5014-21
- Seeing and Visualizing: It's Not What You Think (MIT Press, 2004) ISBN 978-0-262-1621-73
- Things and Places: How the Mind Connects with the World (MIT Press, 2007) (Jean Nicod Lecture Series) ISBN 978-0-262-5161-43

==== As co-author ====
- Fodor, Jerry A.; Pylyshyn, Zenon W. (2015). Minds Without Meanings: An Essay on the Content of Concepts. MIT Press. ISBN 978-0262027908.

== See also ==
- Connectionism
