= Imagery debate =

The imagery debate is a debate that concerns the nature of mental imagery, specifically how such imagery represents information in the mind. Central to the debate is whether mental images are represented in a depictive (picture-like) format or a propositional (language-like) format, with these opposing views referred to as pictorialism and descriptivism, respectively. While numerous scholars have contributed, psychologists Stephen Kosslyn and Zenon Pylyshyn became especially influential advocates of the pictorialist and descriptivist positions. The debate has since attracted significant philosophical attention, encouraging scholars to take mental imagery seriously and to explore how variations in imagery can shape broader theoretical commitments.

== Historical Background ==
The origins of the imagery debate can be traced back to Wilhelm Wundt, who controversially claimed that all mental processes are accompanied by imagery. Although this claim generated early 20th-century disagreement, progress stalled due to the limited empirical tools available at the time. The rise of behaviorism, led by John B. Watson, shifted psychology's focus toward observable behavior and away from introspective topics like imagery. However, by the 1950s and 1960s, behaviorism’s inability to account for complex cognitive phenomena such as language and reasoning contributed to the rise of cognitive psychology. This new field reintroduced the study of internal mental processes, including imagery, memory, and learning.

This shift coincided with developments in artificial intelligence. Researchers such as Newell, Shaw, and Simon used computational models to simulate human cognition, introducing new ways of conceptualizing mental representation. Their work on list-processing demonstrated that variations in information retrieval could be explained either as changes in stored mental content or as differences in the retrieval process itself. This flexibility in interpretation supported both image-based and propositional accounts of cognition.

== Arguments for Pictorialism and Descriptivism ==
=== Pictorialism ===
Mental imagery is typically defined in psychology as a perceptual representation that is not directly triggered by sensory input. Pictorialists argue that when individuals recall information from memory, they do so by constructing internal visual images. For example, if asked about the shape of a dog’s ears, many people report that they first picture a dog and then focus on the ears within that mental image. When greater detail is required, individuals often describe mentally manipulating the image, such as rotating it, zooming in, or adjusting focus, to extract the needed information.

Psychologist Stephen Kosslyn is most closely associated with this view, who proposed that mental images function like visual displays generated by a computer. Using the metaphor of a cathode-ray tube (CRT), Kosslyn argued that mental imagery involves an internal "display" that can be scanned and interpreted by a "mind’s eye." His empirical work suggested that mental images can be transformed through operations such as rotation, scanning, and scaling, much like visual objects in the external world.

==== Empirical Evidence for Pictorialism ====
Compelling empirical support for pictorialism comes from the work of Cooper and Shepard in the 1970s. In their 1973 study Chronometric Studies of the Rotation of Mental Images, participants were shown rotated letters and numbers and asked to identify them. Reaction times increased proportionally with the angle of rotation up to 180 degrees, then decreased back to baseline at 360 degrees. This pattern suggested that individuals mentally rotated the images to align them with a canonical orientation. The results supported the idea that mental rotation is an analog process, mirroring physical rotation.

=== Descriptivism ===
While descriptivists acknowledge that visual imagery may appear to play a role in problem-solving—especially with geometric tasks—they argue that this does not imply the existence of literal internal pictures. Their main contention lies in what mental imagery actually is. Zenon Pylyshyn, the leading proponent of descriptivism, argues that there is no explanatory benefit to positing pictorial representations. Instead, he claims that cognition is grounded in symbolic, language-like structures.

Descriptivists maintain that mental representations are composed of tree-structured symbolic encodings that exhibit properties essential to human thought: compositionality, productivity, and systematicity. These characteristics enable a finite set of elements to produce an infinite variety of thoughts. Since symbolic representation already accounts for core cognitive functions, descriptivists argue that it falls on pictorialists to demonstrate why an alternative, image-based system is necessary.

==== Empirical Evidence for Descriptivism ====
In his paper Imagery and Artificial Intelligence, Pylyshyn critiques the pictorialist position using a wide range of experimental findings. He draws on studies of recall and reconstruction (e.g., Piaget, 1956; Weinstein, 1974; Rock, 1973; Clark, 1973) to argue that the errors individuals make when reproducing visual information—particularly among children—are better explained by limitations in verbal description or conceptual understanding than by deficiencies in an internal image. According to Pylyshyn, pictorialism offers no compelling account for these systematic errors, reinforcing the view that mental imagery is fundamentally propositional rather than depictive.

== Current Status and Ongoing Relevance ==
Although the imagery debate was a central focus of cognitive research in the 1980s, it was never conclusively resolved. Its historical significance lies in how it reshaped both psychology and philosophy by reviving serious consideration of mental imagery, which had been largely dismissed during the behaviorist era.

Some scholars have argued that personal introspective experience influenced researchers’ positions—those who reported vivid mental images were more likely to support pictorialism, while others leaned toward descriptivism. More recent studies using neuroimaging have added new dimensions to the discussion. One fMRI study found that while viewing real scenes strongly activated visual areas like the occipital cortex, imagining those same scenes primarily engaged prefrontal and parietal regions associated with top-down processing. The imagery condition showed weaker and more diffuse occipital activation, challenging strict pictorialist views that equate mental imagery with perception. These findings support constructive models of imagery, emphasizing the brain's active role in generating internal representations.

Though some of the original contributors have declared the debate "dead," its legacy persists in contemporary research on imagination, memory, and consciousness, and disorders such as aphantasia.
