= Arboreal theory =

Theory about primate evolution

The arboreal theory claims that primates evolved from their ancestors by adapting to arboreal life. It was proposed by Grafton Elliot Smith (1912), a neuroanatomist who was chiefly concerned with the emergence of the primate brain.

== Summary ==
Primates are thought to have developed several of their traits and habits initially while living in trees. One key component to this argument is that primates relied on sight over smell. They were able to develop a keen sense of depth perception, perhaps because of the constant leaping that was necessary to move about the trees. Primates also developed hands and feet that were capable of grasping. This was also a result of arboreal life, which required a great deal of crawling along branches, and reaching out for fruit and other food. These early primates were likely to have eaten foods found in trees, such as flowers, fruits, berries, gums, leaves, and insects. They are thought to have shifted their diets towards insects in the early Cenozoic era, when insects became more numerous.
