= CyborgNest =

Human enhancement company

CyborgNest Ltd.
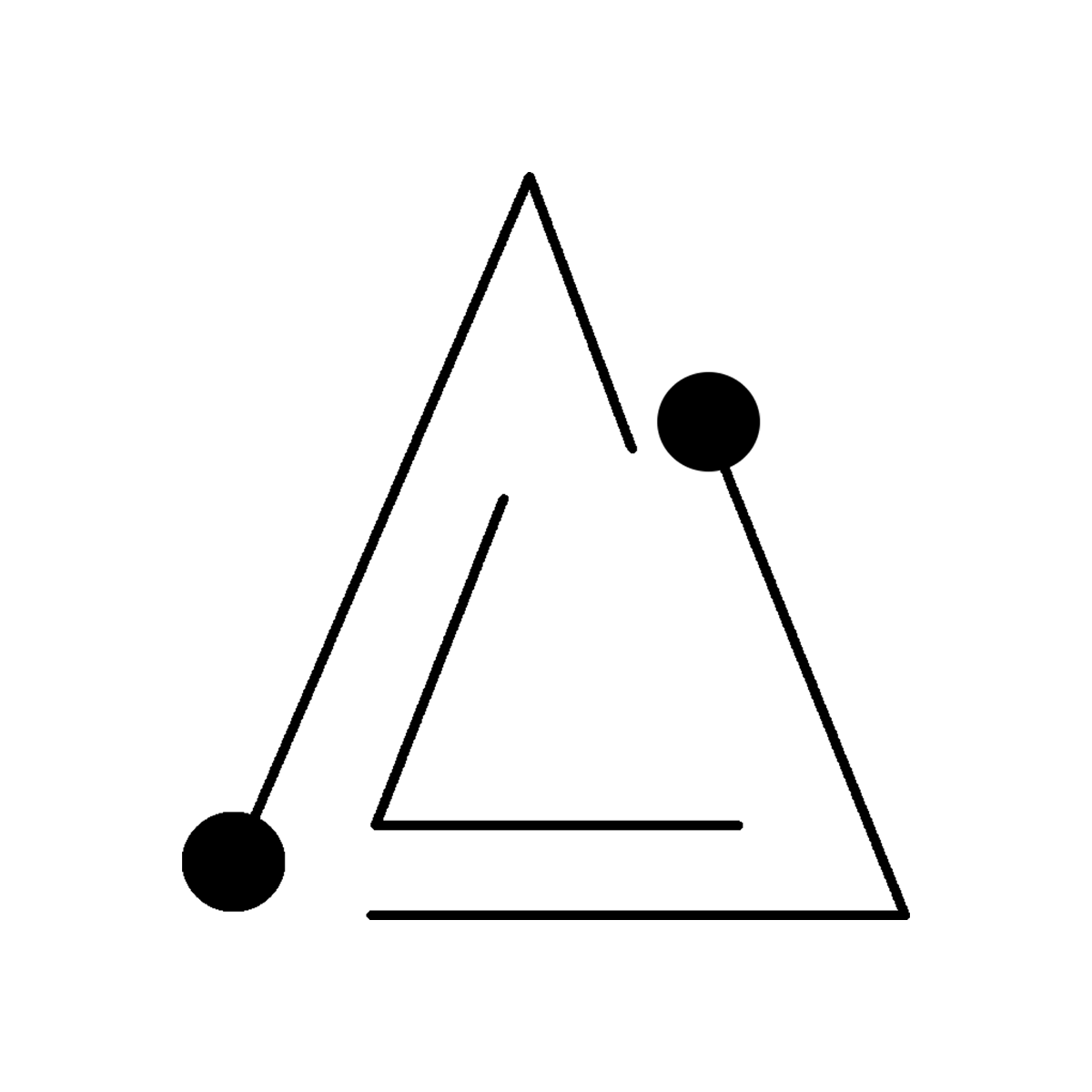
- Industry: Sensory Augmentation, Human Enhancement, Haptic Technology, Wearables
- Founded: 2017
- Founder: Liviu Babitz, Olivier de Simone, Scott Cohen
- Headquarters: London, UK
- Website: http://www.cyborgnest.net

CyborgNest Ltd is a company headquartered in London, United Kingdom. The start-up sells sensory enhancement technology and created a wearable haptic compass called NorthSense, inspired by the NorthPaw, an earlier haptic compass made by the now-defunct Sensebridge. The device was released in 2017 to allow wearers to sense the Earth's magnetic field. It is unclear whether humans do, or did, possess this sense.

== Devices ==
=== NorthSense ===
In 2017, CyborgNest released the NorthSense, a miniaturized circuit board with over 200 components, with a silicone sleeve. The device was attached to the wearer's chest via steel piercings, and vibrated when the wearer faced magnetic north.

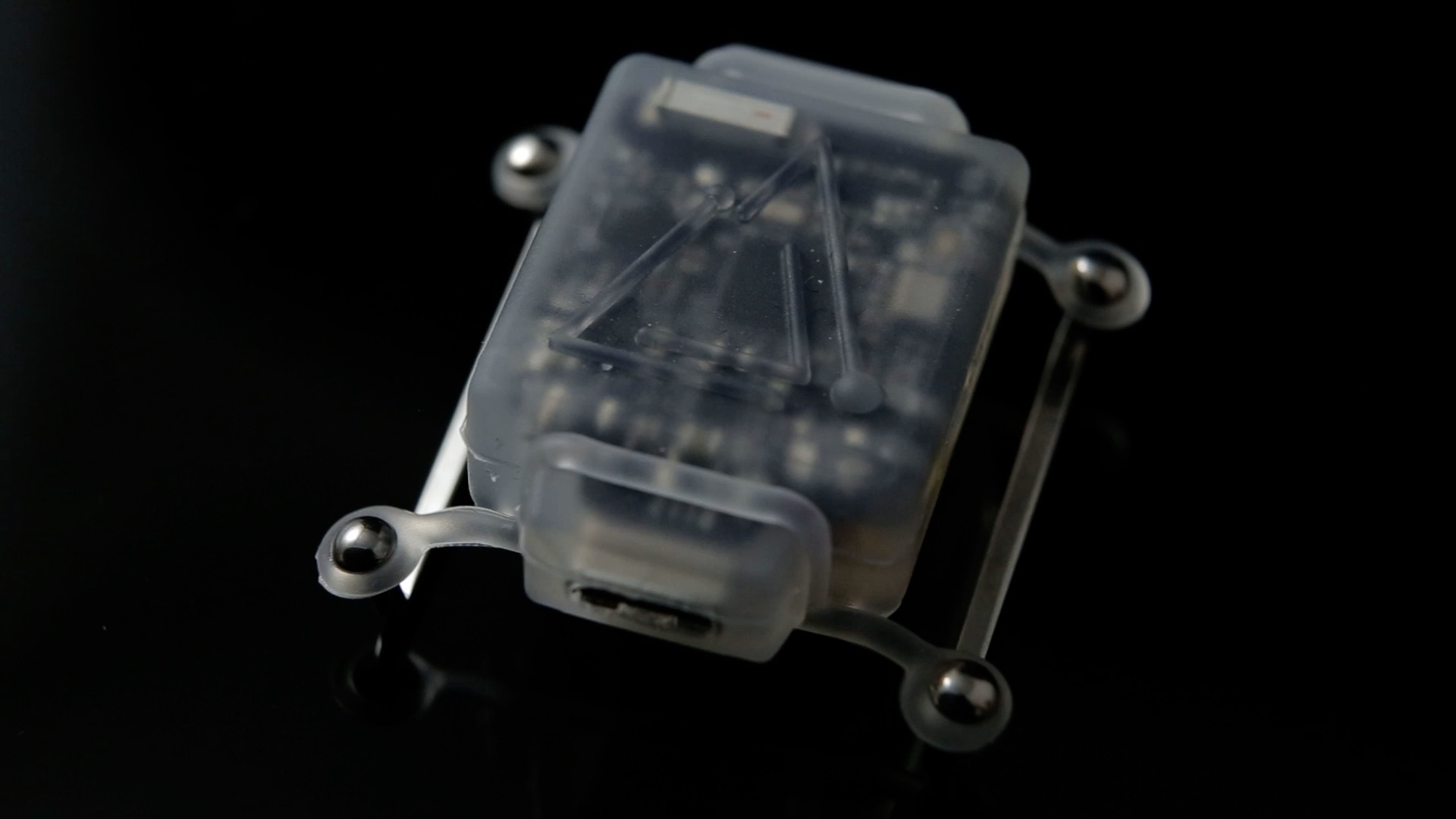
NorthSense 2017. A miniature circuit board in a silicone sleeve, with steel piercings to attach to the wearers' body.

The device was made in a production batch of 400 units. NorthSense was documented in some technology articles.

The technology follows the principles of Sensory Substitution Devices (SSD), created by neuroscientist Paul Bach-y-Rita in the 1960s. SSDs are devices which translate one sense into another in order to compensate for an impaired sense. NorthSense also builds on the research of other similar haptics devices, such as the naviBelt (previously feelspace belt), which gives directional information through haptic motors around the wearer's waist. NorthSense was created using SSD principles but as a non-therapeutic device (not for medical use), transmitting non-human sensory information (the Earth's magnetic field), and therefore it is categorised as a sensory augmentation technology.

=== Sentero ===
CyborgNest ran an Indiegogo crowdfunding campaign for the Sentero (presale) in July 2020 where crowdfunders raised approximately £50,000. Sentero was allegedly delivered to 50 of its crowdfunders, however it was never officially released and production has been cancelled. Backers were offered a refund.

Like the NorthSense, Sentero claimed that it would allow wearers to haptically feel the Earth's magnetic field (north), and also added the ability to "sense" the direction of places and people, and feel their heartbeat.

== See also ==
- Sensory substitution
- Human enhancement
- Body hacking
- Neil Harbisson
- Moon Ribas
- Posthumanism
- Extended mind thesis
