= Brainport =

Brain-computer interface technology

BrainPort is a technology whereby sensory information can be sent to one's brain through an electrode array which sits atop the tongue. It was initially developed by Paul Bach-y-Rita as an aid to people's sense of balance, particularly of stroke victims. Bach-y-Rita founded Wicab in 1998.

It has also been developed for use as a visual aid, demonstrating its ability to allow a blind person to see his or her surroundings in polygonal and pixel form. In this scenario, a camera picks up the image of the surrounding, the information is processed by a chip which converts it into impulses which are sent through an electrode array, via the tongue, to the person's brain. The human brain is able to interpret these impulses as visual signals and they are then redirected to the visual cortex, allowing the person to "see." This is similar in part to how a cochlear implant works, in that it transmits electrical stimuli to a receiving device in the body.

The BrainPort V100 oral electronic vision aid was approved by the Food and Drug Administration (FDA) on 18 June 2015.

== See also ==
- Sensory substitution
- Neuroplasticity
