= Christopher Tyler =

British neuroscientist

Christopher W. Tyler
- Education: University of Leicester; Aston University; University of Keele
- Scientific career
- Fields: Neuroscience

Christopher William Tyler is a British neuroscientist, creator of the autostereogram ("Magic Eye" pictures), and is the Head of the Brain Imaging Center at the Smith-Kettlewell Eye Research Institute He also holds a professorship at City University of London.

== Biography ==
After earning his PhD from the University of Keele (1970), Tyler became a research fellow at Bell Labs (1974–75), where he worked with Bela Julesz, a vision scientist, psychologist, and MacArthur Fellow. Julesz is well known for his invention of the random dot stereogram, for which he used a computer to create a stereo pair of random-dot images. Although nothing except random dots can be seen in each pair, when people look through a stereoscope so that the left image is viewed only by the left eye and the right image is viewed only by the right eye, they see three-dimensional shapes. After leaving Bell Labs, Tyler took a position at Smith-Kettlewell Institute of Visual Sciences.

Tyler's scientific interests are in visual perception and visual neuroscience. His research has contributed to the study of form, symmetry, flicker, motion, color, and stereoscopic depth perception in adults and he has developed tests for the diagnosis of eye diseases in infants and of retinal and optic nerve diseases in adults. He has studied visual processing and photoreceptor dynamics in other species such as butterflies and fish.

Tyler's recent scientific work concerns theoretical, psychophysical, and functional MRI studies of the structure of global processes such as structure from motion, symmetry, figure/ground and stereoscopic depth perception, and their susceptibility to damage in traumatic brain injury.

Tyler's present and recent past associates include Lora Likova, Josh Solomon, Chien-Chung Chen, Spero Nicholas, Mark Schira, Lenny Kontsevich, Russ Hamer, Anthony Norcia, Lauren Barghout, Amy Ione.

== Autostereogram ==
Shortly after arriving at Smith-Kettlewell (in 1979) Tyler significantly advanced Julesz's random dot stereogram research when he invented the random-dot autostereogram. Such autostereograms made it possible for a person to see 3-dimensional shapes from a single 2-dimensional image without the aid of a stereoscope. These images were later known as the “Magic Eye” after they were popularized by several N.E. Thing Enterprises publications that spent a number of weeks on the New York Times Bestsellers list.

== Art Investigations ==
Tyler's art investigation articles fall under various topics, including composition, perspective studies, the eye-centering controversy, David Hockney's optical hypothesis, Leonardo self-portraiture, Manet's last painting A Bar at the Folies-Bergère, Masolino, space in 20th-century art, symmetry: art and neuroscience, the structure of consciousness, and computer art.

Tyler also has made convincing arguments against the thesis supported by Hockney's book Secret Knowledge: Rediscovering the Lost Techniques of the Old Masters that optical projection techniques aided many artist's paintings beginning in the early 15th century, but spread over about two centuries between 1420 and 1595, citing variously Fabriano, Jan van Eyck, Pisanello, Mantegna, Melozzo di Forli, Cranach, Raphael and Moroni. Tyler showed with geometric reconstructions at his web site that the art works under discussion are brilliant paintings by eye rather than those compatible with optical projections.

== Octant projection ==
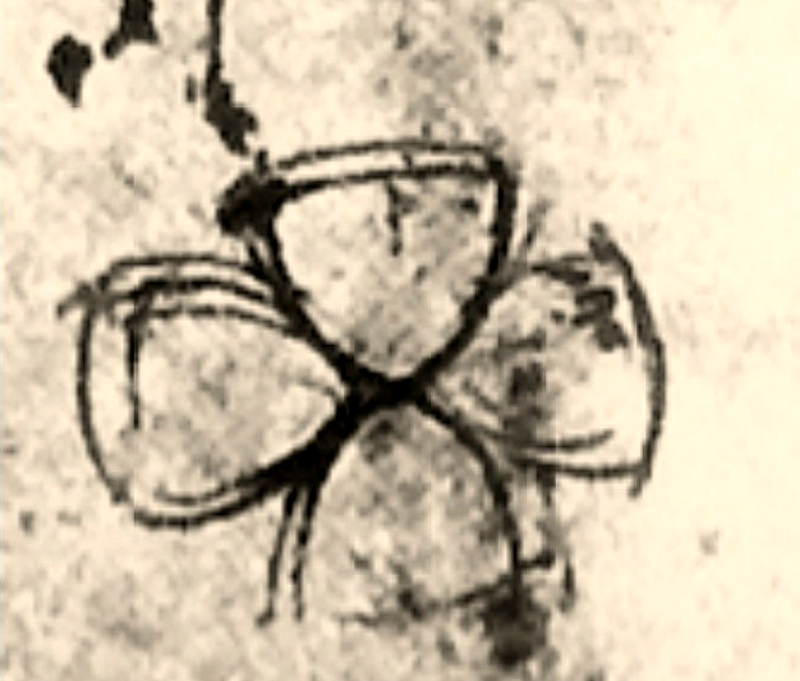
Outline of the projection Da Vinci octant in the Codex Atlanticus

The octant projection or octants projection is a type of projection proposed for the first time, in 1508, by Leonardo da Vinci in his Codex Atlanticus. Tyler demonstrated Leonardo's authorship, who stated "For those projections dated later than 1508, his drawings should be effectively considered the original precursors ...". Tyler argued his case by separating Leonardo's projection authorship (1508) from Leonardo's map authorship (1514), unlike other authors who had treated the authorship of both map and projection together.

== Consciousness Studies ==
Tyler's interests in the nature of consciousness have resulted in a reconceptualization of the essence of quantum physics, in which the Schrödingerian superposition of states is expressed as an inherent property of the conception of probability held by the conscious investigator rather than a property of the physical system per se [FoM paper]. While this retains the role of consciousness in the quantum framework, by casting the superposition solely as a property of the neural conceptualization, it resolves many of the paradoxes of quantum physics within the domain of classical physics.
