= Laura Busse =

German neuroscientist (born 1977)

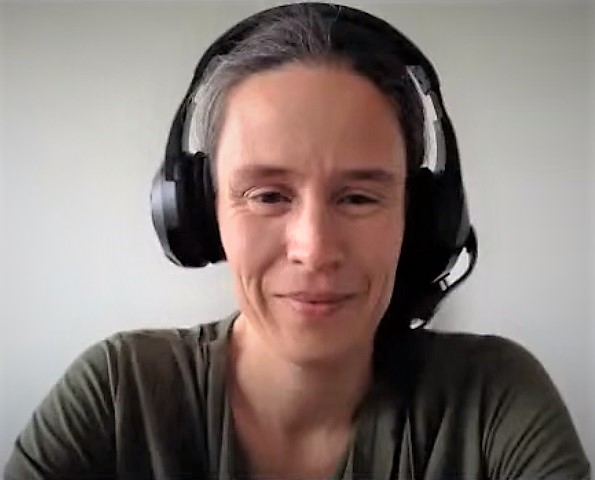
- Busse in 2021
- Born: 19 September 1977 (age 48); Bergisch-Gladbach, Germany
- Education: Leipzig University (B.S.); Max Planck Research School at the University of Tübingen (M.Sc.); German Primate Centre (Ph.D.)
- Known for: Neural circuits underlying visual processing and perception
- Awards: Berlin-Brandenburg Academy of Sciences Award (2009); Junior Scientist Award of the Leibniz-Gemeinschaft (2008); Förderpreis’ of the Berlin-Brandenburg Academy of Sciences (2008); Doctoral Thesis Prize “Effects of selective attention on sensory processing of visual motion” (2007)
- Scientific career
- Fields: Neuroscience
- Institutions: LMU Munich

Laura Busse (born 19 September 1977) is a German neuroscientist and professor of Systemic Neuroscience within the Division of Neurobiology at LMU Munich. Busse's lab studies context-dependent visual processing in mouse models by performing large scale in vivo electrophysiological recordings in the thalamic and cortical circuits of awake and behaving mice.

== Early life and education ==
Busse was born in Bergisch-Gladbach, Germany, on 19 September 1977. She had an early interest in brain studies and received a scholarship from the State of Bavaria that supported her studies in basic psychology at Leipzig University in Germany from 1997 to 1999. Busse then pursued further studies at the Max Planck Research School at the University of Tübingen in Germany where she focused in Neural and Behavioral Sciences from 1999 to 2001.

During her time at Tübingen, Busse pursued research abroad for her Master's in Neuroscience. She moved to the United States for 6 months where she studied under the mentorship of Marty Woldorff at Duke University. Busse explored the cognitive underpinnings of attention in the human brain in the Center for Cognitive Neuroscience at Duke University. After successfully completing her Master's in 2001, Busse stayed at Duke University for another year to work as a research technician, continuing to explore the neurobiological underpinnings of cognition using various imaging techniques such as fMRI, EEG, and ERP.

In late 2002, Busse pursued her doctoral work back in Germany at the German Primate Center Göttingen and the Bernstein Center for Computational Neuroscience. Busse worked under the mentorship of Stefan Treue, where she entered the field of visual processing, exploring the neural basis of visual perception using non-human primates as a model organism. Busse completed her PhD in neuroscience in 2006 and then moved back to the United States for one year funded by the Leopoldina Postdoctoral Scholarship. Busse completed her postdoctoral work at the Smith-Kettlewell Eye Research Institute in San Francisco, USA in 2007 and then moved to the Institute of Ophthalmology at the University College London, in the United Kingdom to work as a Research Associate under the mentorship of Matteo Carandini from 2008 to 2010. Under Carandini, Busse explored visual processing in the cat V1 and visual behavior in mice.

=== Cognitive Neuroscience of Attention ===
In the Woldorff Lab, Busse explored caveats to fMRI experimental trial structure in human fMRI experiments. Since fMRI experiments often suffer from extensive overlap of adjacent trial brain signals, experimenters started to implement “null” or “no-stim” trials in order to provide time for extraction of stimulus generated signal during non-event trials. However, Busse sought to explore the hypothesis that “null-event” trials actually evoke unique brain activity patterns, called the omitted stimulus response (OSR). In an auditory task, Busse found significant OSRs, defined by an early posterior negative wave followed by a larger anterior positive wave, across a variety of stimulus rates and omitted stimulus percentages. Her work provided not only insight into the brain's OSR but also to the caveat associated with using OSRs as a “null” trial.

Busse then published a paper in the Proceedings of the National Academy of Sciences exploring the phenomenon of cross-modal attentional spreading. Busse found that when a subject is paying attention to a stimulus in one sensory modality, it increases the subject's attention to a non-related stimulus in a different sensory modality. This finding elucidated the idea that simultaneous yet disconnected stimuli can be grouped into one multisensory object enhancing the cognitive processing that is allocated to both stimuli.

=== Visual Attention and Processing ===
For her graduate work, Busse explored how cognition influences sensory information processing. For example, Busse became interested in top-down processing of sensory information in the case of visual attention, which is the ability of the brain to focus on one aspect of the visual environment even though it is taking in multitudes of visual information at once. Busse first showed both spatial and feature-based influences of exogenous cueing on motion processing. Autonomic shifts in attention, driven by exogenous cueing, appeared to be integrally driven by characteristic modulations of sensory processing. Busse then explored how cognitive attention in macaques changes the neural representation of motion information. Busse found that visual attention enhances the spatio-temporal structure of receptive fields for moving objects. Busse completed her dissertation in 2008, showing that cognitive factors have strong modulatory effects on the processing of visual motion.

In her postdoctoral studies, Busse first explored visual processing in the primary visual cortex in cats. Busse found that when populations of neurons encode multiple stimuli simultaneously, a model of contrast normalization best explains how neurons represent multiple stimuli in V1. Essentially, the population response can be described as a weighted sum of the individual responses to the components of the visual stimulus. Not only did their modelling of normalization hold in cats, but also extended to recordings from human primary visual cortex.

Busse was then ready to move her experiments into mice, a common model organism is systems neuroscience to dissect neural circuits, but she first had to pioneer a new approach to be able to relate vision circuits to perception in mice. Busse extensively trained mice to detect visual contrast using trial-based operant conditioning. After extensive training, they found that choices mice made in this operant task were not only based on the learned contrast association but also factors such as reward value or recent failures. When they used a generalized linear model to decode the neural data to predict behavioral outputs, they found that the decoder performed better than the mouse suggesting that the mouse might not be using the V1 information in the most optimal way.

== Career and research ==
In 2010, Busse became a Junior Research Group Leader in the Werner Reichardt Center for Integrative Neuroscience at the University of Tübingen, in Germany. She led a team of researchers to approach studying the visual stimuli in an ethologically relevant way. Since visual systems are designed to reflect an organism's environment, Busse shaped her research program around probing the neural circuits underlying visual processing with stimuli similar to those that would be experienced in that organism's natural environment.

In 2016, Busse was recruited to LMU Munich in Germany to hold a professorship within the Munich Center for Neurosciences. Busse currently leads the Vision Circuits Lab along with co-principal investigator Steffen Katzner within the Department of Biology, Neurobiology Division.

=== Exploring Neuronal Circuits of Visual Perception in Mice ===
As a Junior Research Group Leader, Busse began to explore the neural circuits underlying visual processing in mouse models. Busse began by asking whether surround suppression, a computation known to underlie visual salience, could be observed in the V1 cortex. Busse and her team found that in awake mice, parvalbumin positive interneurons in the primary visual cortex mediate surround suppression, however, when mice are under anesthesia, this profoundly affects surround suppression and thus spatial integration. Using optogenetics, Busse and her team were able to show in awake mice that activation of PV+ interneurons increases the receptive field size and decreases the suppression of neural populations, underscoring the role these cells play in spatial integration and highlighting the utility of mice in circuit level analyses of visual processing.

Continuing to use mice as models to study visual processing, Busse and her team explored how behavioral context impacts neural activity in V1. They found that locomotion de-correlates V1 population responses however, locomotion seemed to control the tuning of dorsolateral geniculate nucleus population responses. Overall, their findings highlighted novel insight into the effects of locomotion in early visual system information processing.

As a new faculty at LMU Munich, Busse explored whether and how each cortical layer performs surround suppression and coordinates this across cortical layers. Using in vivo recordings, Busse and her group were able to detect that layer 3 and layer 4 exhibited the strongest surround suppression and that intermediate stimulus sizes resulted in the strongest functional connections between layers.

In their 2019 publication in Neuron, Busse and her colleagues at Tübingen shed light on the mechanisms by which the large degree of visual information coming in from the retina is processed and transferred in a manageable way to the visual cortex. In the feedforward visual processing pathway, the retina extracts visual information from light inputs and passes this information on via its output layer of retinal ganglion cells (RGCs), which project axons to the dorsolateral geniculate nucleus (dLGN) of the thalamus, which in turn routes this information to the primary visual cortex (V1). Whereas the dLGN has traditionally been thought of as a passive relay in visual signal processing, Busse and her colleagues investigate the hypothesis that it might instead be involved in actively shaping visual signals via several factors including recombination of incoming RGC inputs, processing of cortico-thalamic feedback inputs and local inhibitory interneuron computations, amongst others, which will actively shape the output signals sent to the primary visual cortex (V1) (e.g. via altering the thalamic firing modes between burst vs. tonic firing). To test the contribution of recombination of retinal input signals from RGCs, Busse and her colleagues recorded responses from RGCs and thalamic cells to the same set of visual stimuli and then used computational modelling to see which retinal cells contribute to the responses of thalamic cells. Fascinatingly, they found that the output of one thalamic cell relies on no more than 5 retinal cells, and that though these retinal inputs are combined to generate an output, they are not given equal weights. Their work highlighted the active role of the thalamus in signal processing, not just signal relaying as is thought to be the canonical function of the thalamus.

== Awards and honors ==
- 2009 Berlin-Brandenburg Academy of Sciences Award
- 2008 Junior Scientist Award of the Leibniz-Gemeinschaft
- 2008 Förderpreis’ of the Berlin-Brandenburg Academy of Sciences
- 2007 Doctoral Thesis Prize “Effects of selective attention on sensory processing of visual motion”

== Select publications ==
- Román Rosón, M., Bauer, Y., Kotkat, A.H., Berens, P., Euler, T., and Busse, L. (2019). Mouse dLGN Receives Functional Input from a Diverse Population of Retinal Ganglion Cells with Limited Convergence. Neuron 102, 462–476.e8.
- Jurjut, O., Georgieva, P., Busse, L., and Katzner, S. (2017). Learning Enhances Sensory Processing in Mouse V1 before Improving Behavior. J. Neurosci. 37, 6460–6474.
- Khastkhodaei, Z., Jurjut, O., Katzner, S., and Busse, L. (2016). Mice can use second-order, contrast-modulated stimuli to guide visual perception. J Neurosci, 36(16):4457–69.
- Erisken, S., Vaiceliunaite, A., Jurjut, O., Fiorini, M., Katzner, S., and Busse, L. (2014). Effects of locomotion extend throughout the mouse early visual system. Current Biology, 24(24):2899–2907.
- Vaiceliunaite, A., Erisken, S., Franzen, F., Katzner, S., and Busse, L. (2013). Spatial integration in mouse primary visual cortex. Journal of Neurophysiology, 110(4):964–972.
- Busse, L., Ayaz, A., Dhruv, N. T., Katzner, S., Saleem, A. B., Schölvinck, M. L., Zaharia, A. D., and Carandini, M. (2011). The detection of visual contrast in the behaving mouse. The Journal of Neuroscience, 31(31):11351–11361.
- Busse, L., Wade, A. R., and Carandini, M. (2009). Representation of concurrent stimuli by population activity in visual cortex. Neuron, 64(6):931–942.
