= Smith-Kettlewell Eye Research Institute =

Non-profit organization in San Francisco

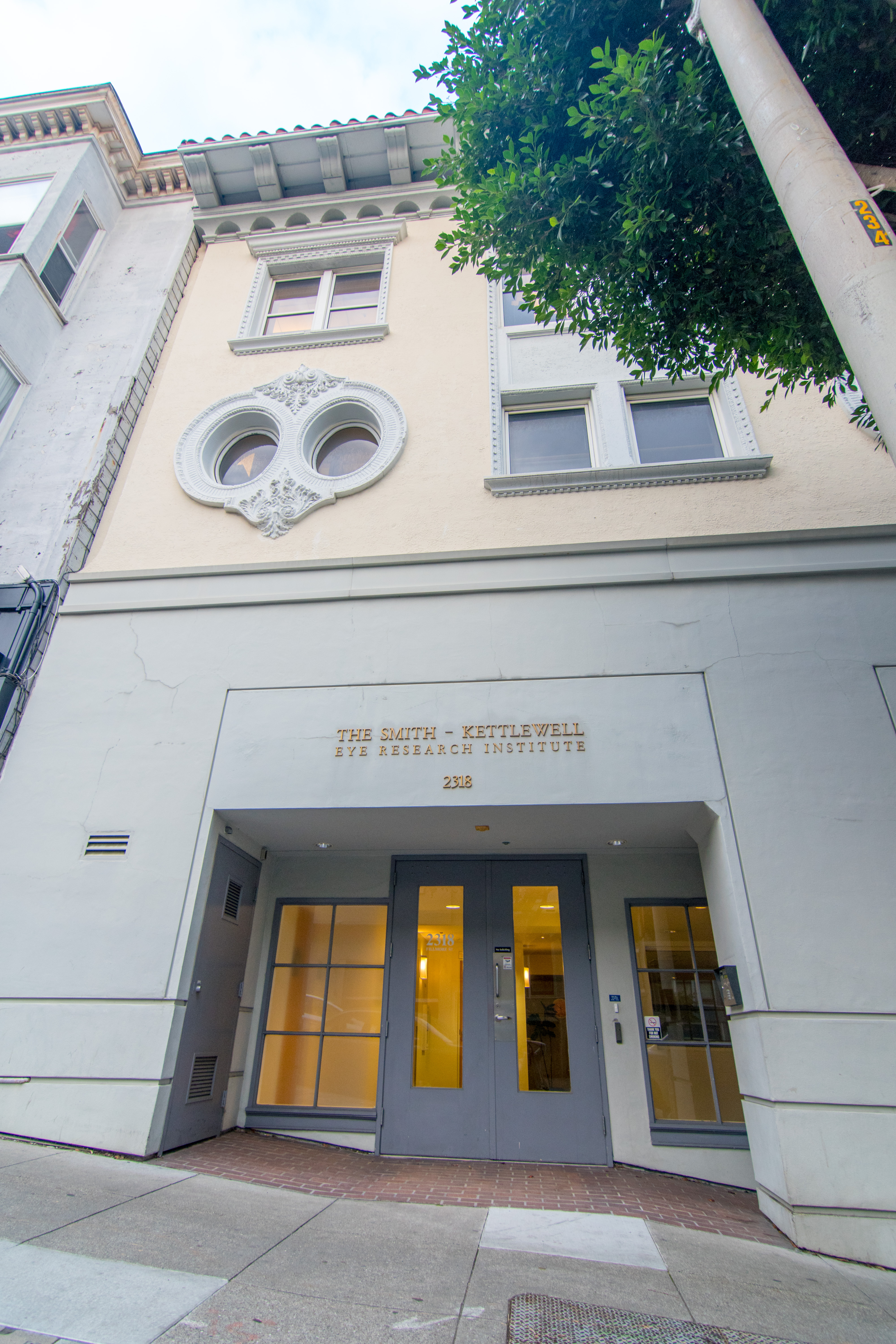
- Street entrance to the Smith-Kettlewell Eye Research Institute circa 2017
- Established: 1959
- Location: San Francisco, California, United States; 37.791215°N 122.434193°W
- Website: www.ski.org

The Smith-Kettlewell Eye Research Institute (SKERI) is a nonprofit research institute in San Francisco, California, with a focus on vision science and rehabilitation engineering. It was founded in 1959 by Arthur Jampolsky and Alan B. Scott, when some members of Stanford University's Ophthalmology Department elected to stay in San Francisco rather than move to Palo Alto. The institute is located in the Pacific Heights district of San Francisco.

== Scientific contributions ==
The Institute did early experiments in sensory substitution, especially the substitution of tactile information for visual information to help blind people navigate and other methods to obtain accessible technology. This research is often performed by scientists who are blind, such as Josh Miele.

The institute's use of botulinum toxin in humans as a therapy to treat strabismus. This initial therapeutic use led to later cosmetic use in Botox. Other impactful work involved Anthony Norcia's study of vision in infants and Erich Sutter's invention of the multifocal electroretinogram and of the multifocal evoked potential.

The Institute has originated various visual illusions, including Christopher Tyler's development of autostereograms, and Anthony Norcia's coffer illusion. Also popular are Tyler's analysis of the position of eyes in paintings, of Mona Lisa's smile and of Leonardo da Vinci's possible eye condition.

== Scientists ==
Over the decades, the Institute has hosted generations of vision scientists, including

- Paul Bach-y-Rita
- Laura Busse
- T. Rowan Candy
- Matteo Carandini
- Gunilla Haegerstrom-Portnoy
- Julie M Harris
- Arthur Jampolsky
- Suzanne McKee
- Joshua Miele
- Ken Nakayama
- Anthony Norcia
- Larry Scadden
- David Schneeweis
- Alan B Scott
- Erich Sutter
- Jeffrey Tsai
- Christopher Tyler
- Alan Yuille
