= Julie M. Harris =

Scientist

Julie Harris
- Born: Julie Marie Harris; 1967 (age 58–59)
- Education: Imperial College London (BSc); University of Oxford (DPhil)
- Scientific career
- Fields: Vision; Eye movements Perception; Binocular vision
- Workplaces: Smith-Kettlewell Eye Research Institute; University of Edinburgh; Newcastle University
- Thesis: Statistical efficiency of human stereopsis (1992)
- Doctoral advisor: Andrew J. Parker
- Website: julieharrislab.wp.st-andrews.ac.uk/julie-harris

Julie Marie Harris (born 1967) has been Director of Research in the School of Psychology and Neuroscience (2011–21) and a Professor of Vision Science at the University of St Andrews. Her research investigates visual systems and camouflage.

== Early life and education ==
Harris was born in Wolverhampton. She initially studied physics at Imperial College London and graduated in 1988. She moved to the University of Oxford for her doctoral studies and earned her Doctor of Philosophy degree under the supervision of Andrew J. Parker in 1992. Her doctoral research investigated the efficiency of binocular stereopsis. To do this she added binocular disparity noise to a stereogram and compared judgements of depths made by a human with those made by an ideal detector with the correct disparity. She demonstrated that human efficiency was low, particularly when depth profiles were not smooth.

== Career and research ==
Harris joined the Smith-Kettlewell Eye Research Institute in San Francisco in 1992, where she worked as a postdoctoral fellow for three years.

In 1995 Harris was appointed a lecturer in neuroscience at the University of Edinburgh. She moved to Newcastle University in 1998 where she was made an associate professor. In 2005 she joined the University of St Andrews as a Professor of Psychology.

Harris studies visual systems; and in particular what environmental information a given visual system can process and how it makes use of the information. As part of this research Harris uses psychophysical, computational and behavioural approaches, which allow her to understand the processes that underlie human vision and how they connect to motor action. Her early work considered the accuracy of binocular judgements of the direction of motion. Through her work Harris looks to uncover countershading, a means by which animal species disrupt shape perception, how the brain perceives motion, shape and depth and different eye movements. Her studies of animal camouflage have included monitoring the three-dimensional camouflage of the caterpillar. In 2019 Harris and co-workers uncovered how the brain processes three-dimensional information; establishing that the brain separated motion signals into two distinct pathways as they move from the eye to the brain. These signals – of which one arrives quickly and the other slowly – allow for information to be extracted simultaneously from each pathway, and alert the visual system that there is a three-dimensional object. She has shown that people with lazy eye syndrome may be able to process fast three-dimensional motion. Harris looks to apply this understanding to situations where visual communication goes wrong.

Alongside her work on animal camouflage and three-dimensional vision, Harris has investigate the relationship between visual sensory and visuo-motor behaviour during the training of elite athletes. In 2019 she was awarded a Leverhulme Trust grant to study how unusual patterns in complex visual environments may specifically stimulate the visual system.

=== Selected publications ===
Her publications include;

- Guidance of locomotion on foot uses perceived target location rather than optic flow
- Speed discrimination of motion-in-depth using binocular cues
- Binocular vision and motion-in-depth
