= ASCII stereogram =

3D optical illusion using ASCII art

ASCII stereograms are a form of ASCII art based on stereograms to produce the optical illusion of a three-dimensional image by crossing the eyes appropriately using a single image or a pair of images next to each other.

To obtain the 3D effect (in Figure 1 for instance), it is necessary for the viewer to diverge their eyes such that two adjacent letters in the same row come together. To help in focusing, try to make the two capital Os at the top look like three. Ensure that the image of the central dot is stable and in focus. Once this has been done, look down at the rest of the image and the 3D effect should become apparent. If the Os at the bottom of Figure 1 look like three, then the effect is reversed. It is also possible to obtain opposite 3D effects by crossing the eyes rather than diverging them.

Figure 1: Near and far distances.

                             O    O
n   n   n   n   n   n   n   n   n   n   n   n   n   n   n   n   n
f    f    f    f    f    f    f    f    f    f    f    f    f    f
e   e   e   e   e   e   e   e   e   e   e   e   e   e   e   e   e
a    a    a    a    a    a    a    a    a    a    a    a    a    a
a   a   a   a   a   a   a   a   a   a   a   a   a   a   a   a   a
r    r    r    r    r    r    r    r    r    r    r    r    r    r
r   r   r   r   r   r   r   r   r   r   r   r   r   r   r   r   r
                            O       O

                          

Figure 2 demonstrates the effect even more dramatically. Once the 3D image effect has been achieved, moving the viewer's head away from the screen increases the stereo effect even more. Moving horizontally and vertically a little also produces interesting effects.

Figure 3 shows a Single Image Random Text Stereogram (SIRTS) based on the same idea as a Single Image Random Dot Stereogram (SIRDS). The word "Hi" in relief can be seen when the image clicks into place.

Some people have included stereograms in their "signature" at the end of electronic mail messages and news articles. Figure 4 is such an example.

Figure 2: A floor, wall and ceiling.

                           O          O
.  .  .  .  .  .  .  .  .  .  .  .  .  .  .  .  .  .  .  .  .  .  .
 .   .   .   .   .   .   .   .   .   .   .   .   .   .   .   .   .
   .    .    .    .    .    .    .    .    .    .    .    .    .
   .     .     .     .     .     .     .     .     .     .     .
     .      .      .      .      .      .      .      .      .
 .       .       .       .       .       .       .       .       .
      .        .        .        .        .        .        .
   .         .         .         .         .         .         .
.          .          .          .          .          .          .
|          |          |          |          |          |          |
|          |          |          |          |          |          |
|          |          |          |          |          |          |
|          |          |          |          |          |          |
|          |          |          |          |          |          |
|          |          |          |          |          |          |
   .         .         .         .         .         .         .
      .        .        .        .        .        .        .
 .       .       .       .       .       .       .       .       .
     .      .      .      .      .      .      .      .      .
   .     .     .     .     .     .     .     .     .     .     .
   .    .    .    .    .    .    .    .    .    .    .    .    .
 .   .   .   .   .   .   .   .   .   .   .   .   .   .   .   .   .
.  .  .  .  .  .  .  .  .  .  .  .  .  .  .  .  .  .  .  .  .  .  .

Figure 3: A single image random text stereogram.

                      O              O
OIWEQPOISDFBKJFOIWEQPOISDFBKJFOIWEQPOISDFBKJFOIWEQPOISDFBKJF
EDGHOUIEROUIYWEVDGHOXUIEROIYWEVDGHEOXUIEOIYWEVDGHEOXUIEOIYWE
KJBSVDBOIWERTBAKJBSVEDBOIWRTBAKJBSOVEDBOWRTBAKJBSOVEDBOWRTBA
SFDHNWECTBYUVRGSFDHNYWECTBUVRGSFDHCNYWECBUVRGSFDHCNYWECBUVRG
HNOWFHLSFDGWVRGHNOWFGHLSFDWVRGHNOWSFGHLSDWVRGHNLOWSFGLSDWVRG
YPOWVXTNWFECHRGYPOWVEXTNWFCHRGYPOWNVEXTNFCHRGYPWOWNVETNFCHRG
SVYUWXRGTWVETUISVYUWVXRGTWVETUISVYUWVXRGWVETUISVYUWVXRGWVETU
WVERBYOIAWEYUIVWVERBEYOIAWEYUIVWVERBEYOIWEYUIVWLVERBEOIWEYUI
EUIOETOUINWEBYOEUIOEWTOUINWEBYOEUIOEWTOUNWEBYOETUIOEWOUNWEBY
WFVEWVETN9PUW4TWFVEWPVETN9UW4TWFVETWPVET9UW4TWFBVETWPET9UW4T
NOUWQERFECHIBYWNOUWQXERFECIBYWNOUWFQXERFCIBYWNOFUWFQXRFCIBYW
VEHWETUQECRFVE[VEHWERTUQECFVE[VEHWQERTUQCFVE[VEOHWQERUQCFVE[
UIWTUIRTWUYWQCRUIWTUYIRTWUWQCRUIWTXUYIRTUWQCRUIBWTXUYRTUWQCR
IYPOWOXNPWTHIECIYPOWTOXNPWHIECIYPONWTOXNWHIECIYLPONWTXNWHIEC
R9UHWVETPUNRQYBR9UHWVETPUNRQYBR9UHWVETPUNRQYBR9UHWVETPUNRQYB

Figure 4: A stereogram signature.

 IIIIIIIIIIIIIII   IIIIIIIIIIIIIII  
 H ( )  \|/    H   H   ( )   \|/ H  
 H(   ) -O-    H   H  (   )  -O- H  
 H     )/|\    H   H (     ) /|\ H  
 H======^======H   H======^======H  
 H- |----@-----H   H----| ---@---H  
 H /|\ @\|/ @  H   H   /|\@ \|/@ H 
 H    \|/  \|/ H   H     \|/  \|/H  
 III^IIIIIII^III   III^IIIIIII^III  
Wide eyed stereo  Wide  eyed  stereo    

Moving animated versions of ASCII stereograms are possible too.

== Text emphasis ==
The stereo effect can be used to highlight individual words in a text, as a sort of "secret message". The effect can be disguised when the paragraph is block justified.

Figure 5: Emphasized single words.

According    to    the  According    to    the
police      inspector,  police      inspector,
Edward  John Billings,  Edward John  Billings,
there  are   too  many  there  are   too  many
individuals  too close  individuals  too close
to  the  case to  make  to  the  case to  make
an  arrest.   I  asked  an  arrest.   I  asked
Mary  Smith to comment  Mary Smith  to comment
on  the case,  but she  on  the case,  but she
declined  to  comment,  declined  to  comment,
because  she  is  soon  because  she  is  soon
to   be   married   to  to   be   married   to
Howard  D.  Fredericks, Howard  D. Fredericks,
the   victim's  uncle.  the   victim's  uncle.
Charles  Wilson,   the  Charles   Wilson,  the
victim's      brother,  victim's      brother,
stated that  the chaos  stated that  the chaos
was  responsible  for   was  responsible  for
at least  five suicide  at least  five suicide
attempts   last   week  attempts   last   week
alone.                  alone.                

== Sources ==
Figures 1, 2, 3 and 4 are due to David B. Thomas, Jonathan Bowen, Charles Durst and Marty Hewes respectively. These four stereograms appeared on the publicly accessible alt.3d USENET newsgroup. Figure 5 was invented on the spot by a Wikipedian.

Originally adapted from an article on ASCII Stereograms by the author of that article (and with his permission).
