= Multifocal technique =

Multifocal techniques are used in electroretinogram and visual evoked potential recordings to separate the responses originating from the stimulation of different locations in the visual field (and thus different retinal locations).

The concept is as follows: Each visual field location is stimulated with a stimulus sequence that is uncorrelated to the sequences used for the other locations. All visual field locations are stimulated in parallel with their individual stimulus sequence. The retinal or cortical activity, which is a mixture of the responses from all visual field locations, is recorded with usual electroretinographic or visual evoked potential methods, respectively. Due to the independence of the stimulus sequences, the responses for each visual field location can be extracted using mathematical algorithms.

Mutifocal techniques, in particular the multifocal ERG, are used in the diagnosis of ophthalmological diseases. The multifocal technique was developed in the early 1990s in the laboratory of Erich Sutter at the Smith-Kettlewell Eye Research Institute
