= Alan B. Scott =

Ophthalmologist and developer of Botox (1932–2021)

Alan Brown Scott (July 13, 1932 – December 16, 2021) was an American ophthalmologist specializing in eye muscles and their disorders, such as strabismus (eye misalignment). He is best known for his work in developing and manufacturing the drug that became known as Botox, research described as "groundbreaking" by the ASCRS.

Scott initially developed botulinum type A neurotoxin (botulinum toxin) to treat strabismus, naming it Oculinum™ (“eye aligner”). He was fascinated by the prospect of turning "a deadly poison into a miracle drug for obscure but devastating eye diseases”. The cosmetic application was discovered by accident, during its original use as ophthalmic treatment.

Botox, dubbed “medicine’s answer to duct tape”, has been found to be effective for muscle spasms and contractures, severe sweating and drooling, migraines, urinary incontinence, and many other disorders. In pursuit of new ways to help his patients, Scott made many basic scientific advances concerning eye muscles, their coordination, and their modifiability.

Scott wanted to treat strabismus with a simple, low-cost injection, rather than with conventional surgery under general anesthesia. To reach muscles behind the eye for injection, Scott and colleagues developed EMG-guided injection, which monitors muscle activity to guide needle placement.

== Early life and education ==
Scott attended medical school at the University of California, San Francisco, graduating in 1956. He interned at the University of Minnesota, in surgery (1956–1957), where he also completed a residency (1957–1958) in neurological surgery. Scott completed a residency in ophthalmology at Stanford University Medical Center (1958–1961).

== Professional experience ==
Scott served as a Senior Scientist at the Smith-Kettlewell Eye Research Institute, from 1961 to 2013, and as Director from 1982 to 2004. From 1997 to 2006, he was Vice Chair of Ophthalmology at the California Pacific Medical Center.

He founded the Strabismus Research Foundation in San Francisco, and has served as Director and Senior Scientist since 2013. He also served as Senior Scientist at Eidactics, from 2013.

Scott published numerous articles on the subject of strabismus.

== Major contributions ==
=== Botulinum toxin treatment of eye muscles ===
Strabismus is a disorder of eye movement and alignment caused by imbalances in the actions of muscles that rotate the eyes. In many cases these imbalances can be corrected by weakening a muscle that pulls too strongly, or that has normal activity but overpowers an opposing muscle that has been weakened by disease or trauma. Conventional treatments are surgical, which restore balance by compensatory impairment: tissue is removed to tighten a muscle, and muscles are moved to relax them or to sacrifice one direction of action for another.

Muscles adapt to the lengths at which they are chronically held, so if a paralyzed muscle is stretched by its antagonist, it grows longer, while the antagonist shortens, yielding a permanent effect. With good binocular vision, the brain mechanism of motor fusion (which aligns the eyes on a target visible to both) helps stabilize the corrected alignment.

Strabismus surgery has the undesirable side effect of scarring, which makes frequently needed followup surgeries more difficult, and may generally compromise the eye's mechanics. Non-surgical injection treatments using various anesthetics, alcohols, enzymes, enzyme blockers, and snake neurotoxins were therefore tried. Finally, inspired by Daniel B. Drachman’s work with chicks at Johns Hopkins, Dr Scott and colleagues injected botulinum toxin into monkey extraocular muscles. The result was remarkable: a few picograms induced paralysis that was confined to the target muscle, long in duration, and without side-effects.

Botox is formed by spores of the bacteria Clostridium botulinum, which is found naturally in sediments as well as the intestinal tracts of some animals and fish. The drug binds to receptors in skeletal muscle, nerve endings, the brain, and some smooth muscle, preventing the release of the neurotransmitter acetylcholine. By blocking nerves from sending signals to the muscle to contract, Botox essentially paralyzes the muscles temporarily. After working-out techniques for preparing the toxin and assuring its sterility, potency, and safety, Scott was granted FDA approval for investigational use, and began manufacturing it in his San Francisco lab. He injected the first strabismus patients in 1977, reported its clinical utility, and had soon trained hundreds of ophthalmologists in EMG-guided injection of the drug he named OculinumTM (“eye aligner”).

Based on data from thousands of patients collected by 240 investigators, under the 1983 US Orphan Drug Act, Scott obtained FDA approval in 1989 to market Oculinum for clinical use in the United States to treat adult strabismus and blepharospasm. With the wide acceptance of OculinumTM, Dr. Scott had to “decide if he wanted to be in the pharmaceutical business or be a research scientist”.

In 1991 he therefore sold rights to the drug to the pharmaceutical company Allergan, which rebranded it as Botox®.

Allergan, which markets ocular-care products, purchased the rights to Oculinum in order to service the "niche population" of stabismus patients, for $9M. Botox received FDA approval for cosmetic treatments in 2002. However, the majority of the drug's sales are made for therapeutic treatments.

=== Botulinum toxin treatment of other muscle disorders ===
By 1982, eye muscles had been injected for strabismus and nystagmus (jerky, involuntary eye movements), eyelid muscles for retraction and blepharospasm (sustained, involuntary contractions of muscles around the eye), facial muscles for hemifacial spasm, and limb muscles for dystonia (sustained muscle spasm), all as predicted in Scott's 1973 study.

Scott also injected the first cases of the painful, spastic twisting of the neck known as torticollis, but it was difficult to accept that the specificity and molecular tenacity that made ingested toxin so deadly also made it safe when injected into a target muscle, and no Bay Area physician would try Botox for the muscle contractures of stroke, dystonia, torticollis, or cerebral palsy, until L. Andrew Koman of Wake Forest University in North Carolina pioneered its use to treat pediatric leg spasm in cerebral palsy.

Patient groups quickly spread the word that there were now effective treatments for previously untreatable motility disorders such as blepharospasm, which can result in functional blindness despite an otherwise normal visual system. Torticollis patients discovered that their pain could be markedly reduced, motility increased, and head position improved by toxin injection. But, in 1986, Oculinum Inc, Scott's micromanufacturer and distributor of botulinum toxin, was unable to obtain product liability insurance, and could no longer supply the drug. As stocks became exhausted, patients who had come to rely on periodic injections became desperate. For 4 months, pending resolution of liability issues, American blepharospasm patients traveled to Canadian eye centers for their injections.

=== Electrically guided injection ===
Precisely targeted eye muscle injections are useful for both diagnosis and treatment, but the bodies of the 6 muscles that rotate the eye lie close together, adjacent to the eyeball, and are not normally visible. Scott and colleagues therefore developed EMG-guided injection, a system that uses a hypodermic needle that records the electrical activity of the muscle (the electromyogram or EMG) at its tip. The needle is introduced under local anesthesia, and as the awake patient looks in different directions, the pattern of muscle activity, played through a speaker, indicates when the belly of the target muscle has been entered, and the drug is then injected.

If the patient is not awake, movement-related EMG cannot be recorded. Scott and colleagues therefore developed another system in which the injection needle stimulates, rather than records, producing characteristic eye movements that identify the muscle in which the needle is placed.

=== Strengthening eye muscles ===
Botox injection can weaken and lengthen muscles, but weak, stretched muscles are often the primary problem in strabismus. Scott was therefore developing the anesthetic drug bupivacaine as an injection to strengthen and shorten weak muscles. Bupivacaine injection stresses a muscle and triggers a growth process, analogous to how load-bearing exercise builds skeletal muscles.

Clinical studies over the past decade have demonstrated that bupivacaine injection in a weak muscle has a synergistic effect with Botox injected in its opposing muscle, resulting in permanent strabismus cures in many more cases. Laboratory studies are underway to better understand the cellular effects of bupivacaine injection.

=== Blepharospasm ===
Blepharospasm is the uncontrollable closure of the eyes, which can leave sufferers functionally blind, despite the visual system itself being normal. The cause is unknown, and it may be present from birth or develop later in life. Botox injection can relieve the spasms, but leave patients unable to open their eyes or keep them open. Surgical lid elevation is the current treatment, but static repositioning impairs normal eye blinking and lid closure. Electrically stimulating the muscle that raises the eyelid could provide these patients with useful vision, and would be far superior to surgery, both functionally and cosmetically.

Dr Scott and his colleagues have therefore developed electrodes that are both safe and effective in animals tested with realistic, long-term stimulation regimens. Implantable pulse generators, approved for other applications, would be suitable to power and control these electrodes.

=== Pragmatic Research ===
Scott intended his research to be “directly helpful to people”. “There are interesting and difficult problems still to be solved”, he explained, “and I’m a practicing physician and I see them every day”.

The uniform patient populations and standardized treatments of controlled, so-called “explanatory” research are indeed essential for testing scientific hypotheses and finding small differences. But explanatory research treats patients as means more than ends. “Pragmatic research”, such as Scott's, studies typical, rather than selected patients, and gives treatments customized to patients needs, rather than standardized test treatments. Such research is sometimes considered only preliminary, but the results of pragmatic research are generalizable to broader patient populations, greater treatment variations, and are more likely to have real-world significance in decisions about how best to help people.

== Personal life and death ==
Scott died on December 16, 2021, at the age of 89.

== Honors ==
- Phi Beta Kappa (UC Berkeley)
- Linksz Medal (International Strabismus Association)
- Proctor Medal (Association for Research in Vision and Ophthalmology)
- Costenbader Lecture (American Association of Pediatric Ophthalmology and Strabismus)
- Parks Silver Medal (American Association of Pediatric Ophthalmology and Strabismus)
- Lifetime Achievement Award (International Toxin Association)
- Senior Honor Award (American Academy of Ophthalmology)
- ASCRS Ophthalmology Hall of Fame – 2016 inductee
