= Magic Eye =

Book series with hidden 3D images

Cover of the first book

Magic Eye is a series of books that feature autostereograms, a series of two-dimensional (2D) images that can create the optical illusion of a three-dimensional (3D) scene.

After creating its first images in 1991, creator Tom Baccei worked with Tenyo, a Japanese company that sells magic supplies. Tenyo published its first book in late 1991 titled Miru Miru Mega Yokunaru Magic Eye ("Your Eyesight Gets Better & Better in a Very Short Rate of Time: Magic Eye"), sending sales representatives out to street corners to demonstrate how to see the hidden image. Within a few weeks the first Japanese book became a best seller, as did the second, rushed out shortly after.

The first North American Magic Eye book was published in 1993, under the title Magic Eye: A New Way of Looking at the World.

In 1994, they adapted it for Sunday newspapers.

Magic Eye stereograms have been used by orthoptists and vision therapists in the treatment of some binocular vision and accommodative disorders.
