= Paul Bach-y-Rita =

American neuroscientist (1934–2006)

- Born: 4 April 1934; New York City, U.S.
- Died: 20 November 2006 (aged 72)
- Education: Universidad Nacional Autónoma de México (UNAM)
- Known for: Sensory substitution, Neuroplasticity
- Scientific career
- Fields: Neuroscience, Neuroplasticity
- Workplaces: Smith-Kettlewell Eye Research Institute; University of Wisconsin–Madison
- Academic advisors: Horace W. Magoun

Paul Bach-y-Rita (April 4, 1934 – November 20, 2006) was an American neuroscientist whose most notable work was in the field of neuroplasticity. Bach-y-Rita was one of the first to seriously study the idea of neuroplasticity (although it was first proposed in the late 19th century), and to introduce sensory substitution as a tool to treat patients with neurological disorders.

Bach-y-Rita is known as "the father of sensory substitution".

== Biography ==
Bach-y-Rita was born in New York City to Anne Hyman and Pedro Bach-y-Rita, the latter a Catalan poet and teacher at City College of New York. He studied at the Bronx High School of Science, from which he graduated at the age of fifteen before studying at Mexico City College (now the University of the Americas in Puebla). After his early education, he studied medicine at Universidad Nacional Autónoma de México (UNAM). He initially dropped out, going through several varied jobs, but later returned to finish his degree.

After completing his degree, Bach-y-Rita worked for a short time as a physician in the village of Tilzapotla in Morelos, Mexico, before working for ten years at the Smith-Kettlewell Eye Research Institute in San Francisco, becoming a professor at the age of 37. He joined the University of Wisconsin–Madison in 1983 and became a professor at UW Medical school, Department of Orthopedics and Rehabilitation Medicine and the UW–Madison Engineering School, Department of Biomedical Engineering, while working at other organisations around the world. Bach-y-Rita died at his home on November 20, 2006.

== Work in Sensory Substitution and Neuroplasticity ==
Bach-y-Rita's most notable work was in the field of neuroplasticity. He is seen as the first to propose the concept of sensory substitution to treat patients with disabilities, often those caused by neurological problems. One of the first applications of sensory substitution he created was a chair which allowed blind people to 'see'. The trials he conducted in 1969 are now regarded to be the first form of experimental evidence for neuroplasticity and the feasibility of sensory substitution. Later in his career, Bach-y-Rita created a device which enabled patients with damaged vestibular nuclei to regain their ability to remain balanced, by using an electrical stimulator placed on the tongue which reacted to a motion sensor affixed to the patient. This application enabled patients to remain balanced without the equipment after several weeks use.

=== Early research in Neuroscience ===
The chair he used had a bank of four hundred vibrating plates resting against the blind user's back, and vibrating in connection with a camera placed above the chair, looking forwards. The pattern in which the stimulation occurred enabled the user to "see", often being able to recognise an object coming towards the camera. Bach-y-Rita suggested this was an example of neuroplasticity, as he believed the signals sent to the brain from the skin via touch were being processed in the visual cortex, because of the way the patients interpreted the information.

=== Using Neuroplasticity to treat balance disorders ===
One of his last applications of neuroplasticity was to treat patients with damaged vestibular systems, meaning they were unable to remain balanced. The device he created (now sold as Brainport) consists of a group of accelerometers positioned on the patient and linked to a computer. The information is processed and fed to a small plate which is positioned on the patient's tongue (used because of the high density of sensory receptors). The device stimulates different areas of the tongue, depending on the orientation of the accelerometers. This stimulation enables the patient to stay balanced. However, after repeated use, Bach-y-Rita discovered that the patient remained balanced for a short time after using the device.

After using the device for several weeks, the patient was completely cured, demonstrating another application of neuroplasticity in treating neurological disorders, and also the ability of the brain to adapt to repeated stimuli. Also created was a similar device that enables a patient to see by way of a camera attaching to his or her head and feeding information to the tongue.

=== Research into neuroplasticity to treat stroke patients ===
In 1959, Bach-y-Rita's father, Pedro, had a cerebral infarction (stroke) which caused paralysis to one side of his body and damaged his ability to speak. George Bach-y-Rita—a psychiatrist and Paul's brother—succeeded in treating Pedro so that he was able to lead a normal life, despite the opinion of several doctors that this was impossible. When Pedro died, an autopsy, performed by Dr. Mary Jane Aguilar revealed that Paul's father Pedro had had a major stroke and had severe damage to a large portion of his brain stem, which had not repaired itself after the stroke. The fact that he had made such a significant recovery suggested that his brain had reorganized itself, providing evidence for neuroplasticity.

== See also ==
- Sensory substitution
- Neuroplasticity
- Frenkel exercises
