= Sulfur dioxide =

Chemical compound of sulfur and oxygen

Skeletal formula sulfur dioxide with assorted dimensions
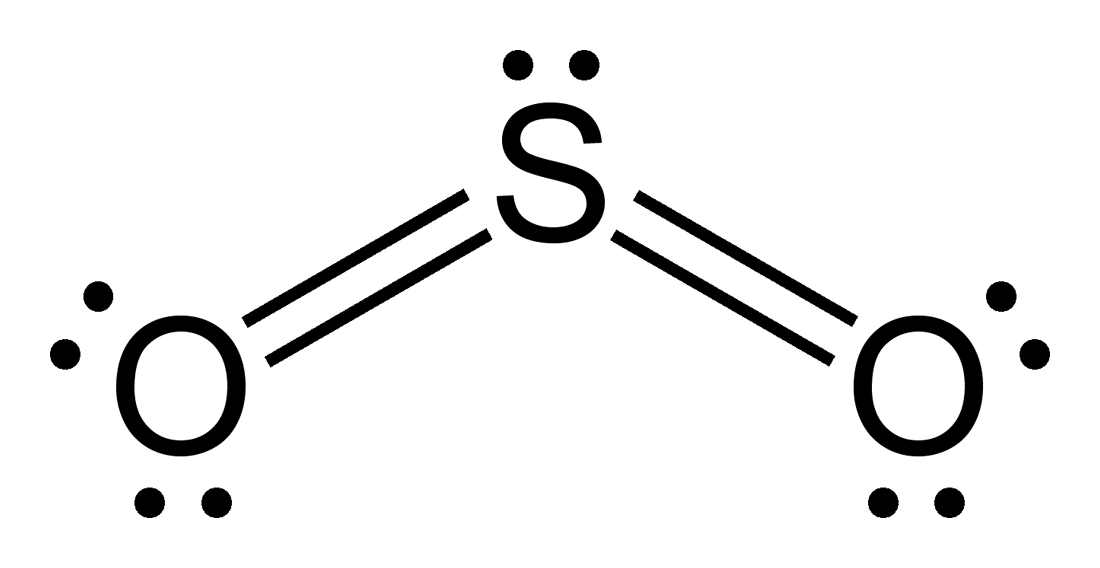
The Lewis structure of sulfur dioxide (SO2), showing unshared electron pairs.
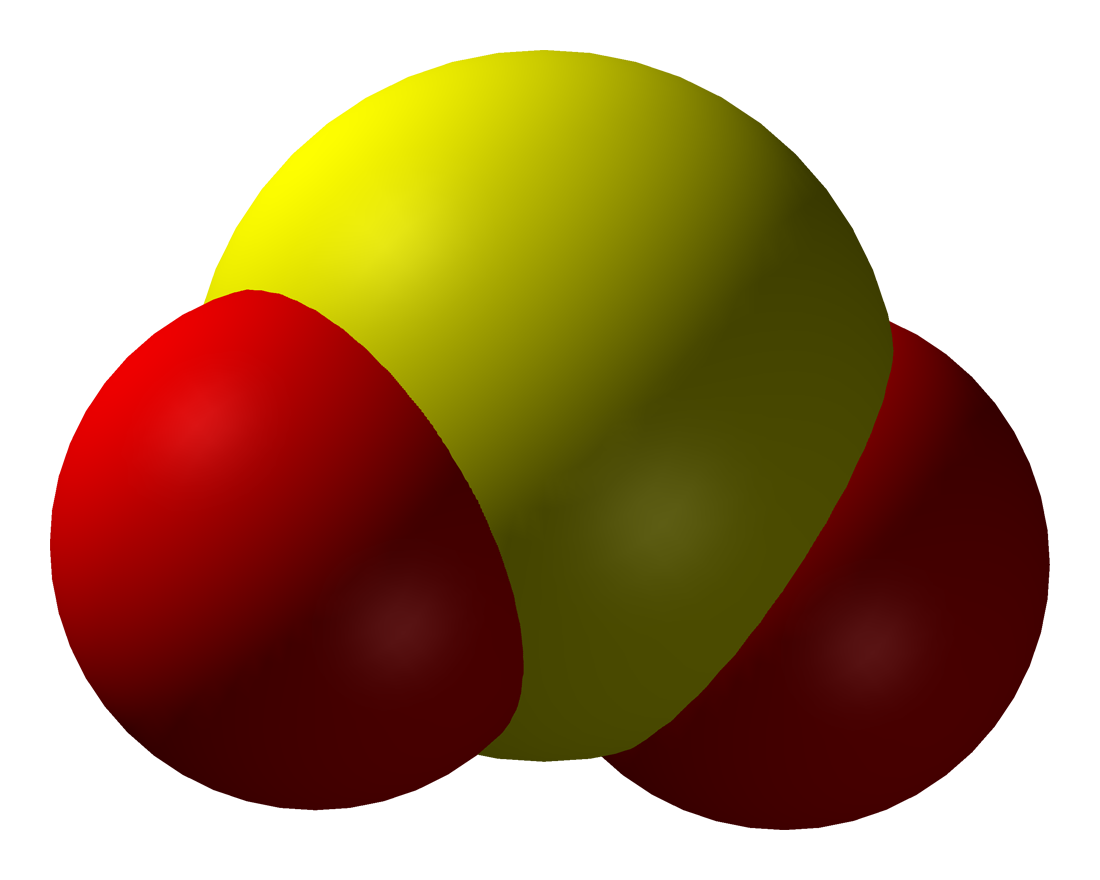
- Spacefill model of sulfur dioxide

Names
- IUPAC name Sulfur dioxide
- Other names: Sulfurous anhydride; Sulfur(IV) oxide

Identifiers
CAS Number	7446-09-5
3D model (JSmol)	Interactive image
Beilstein Reference	3535237
ChEBI	CHEBI:18422
ChEMBL	ChEMBL1235997
ChemSpider	1087
ECHA InfoCard	100.028.359
EC Number	231-195-2
E number	E220 (preservatives)
Gmelin Reference	1443
KEGG	D05961
MeSH	Sulfur+dioxide
PubChem CID	1119
RTECS number	WS4550000
UNII	0UZA3422Q4
UN number	1079, 2037
CompTox Dashboard (EPA)	DTXSID6029672
- InChI: InChI=1S/O2S/c1-3-2 Key: RAHZWNYVWXNFOC-UHFFFAOYSA-N; InChI=1/O2S/c1-3-2 Key: RAHZWNYVWXNFOC-UHFFFAOYAT
- SMILES: O=S=O

Properties
Chemical formula	SO_{2}
Molar mass	64.066 g/mol
Appearance	Colorless gas
Odor	Pungent; similar to a just-struck match
Density	2.619 kg m^{−3}
Melting point	−72 °C; −98 °F; 201 K
Boiling point	−10 °C (14 °F; 263 K)
Solubility in water	94 g/L forms sulfurous acid
Vapor pressure	230 kPa at 10 °C; 330 kPa at 20 °C; 462 kPa at 30 °C; 630 kPa at 40 °C
Acidity (pK_{a})	~1.81
Basicity (pK_{b})	~12.19
Magnetic susceptibility (χ)	−18.2·10^{−6} cm^{3}/mol
Viscosity	12.82 μPa·s

Structure
Point group	C_{2v}
Coordination geometry	Digonal
Molecular shape	Dihedral
Dipole moment	1.62 D

Thermochemistry
Std molar entropy (S^{⦵}_{298})	248.223 J K^{−1} mol^{−1}
Std enthalpy of formation (Δ_{f}H^{⦵}_{298})	−296.81 kJ mol^{−1}

Hazards
- GHS labelling
Pictograms	(GHS04: Compressed Gas) (GHS05: Corrosive) (GHS06: Toxic) (GHS08: Health hazard)
Signal word	Danger
Hazard statements	H314, H331, H370
NFPA 704 (fire diamond)	3 0 0
- Lethal dose or concentration (LD, LC)
LC_{50} (median concentration)	3000 ppm (mouse, 30 min); 2520 ppm (rat, 1 hr)
LC_{Lo} (lowest published)	993 ppm (rat, 20 min); 611 ppm (rat, 5 hr); 764 ppm (mouse, 20 min); 1000 ppm (human, 10 min); 3000 ppm (human, 5 min)
- NIOSH (US health exposure limits)
PEL (Permissible)	TWA 5 ppm (13 mg/m^{3})
REL (Recommended)	TWA 2 ppm (5 mg/m^{3}) ST 5 ppm (13 mg/m^{3})
IDLH (Immediate danger)	100 ppm

Related compounds
Related sulfur oxides	Sulfur monoxide Sulfur trioxide Disulfur monoxide
Related compounds	Ozone; Selenium dioxide Tellurium dioxide Polonium dioxide
- Except where otherwise noted, data are given for materials in their standard state (at 25 °C [77 °F], 100 kPa). verify (what is ?) Infobox references

Sulfur dioxide (IUPAC-recommended spelling) or sulphur dioxide (traditional Commonwealth English) is the chemical compound with the formula SO_{2}. It is a colorless gas with a pungent smell that is responsible for the odor of burnt matches. It is released naturally by volcanic activity and is produced anthropogenically as a by-product of metals refining and the burning of fossil fuels for energy.

Sulfur dioxide is somewhat toxic to humans, although only when inhaled in relatively large quantities for a period of several minutes or more. It was known to medieval alchemists as "volatile spirit of sulfur".

== Structure and bonding ==
SO_{2} is a bent molecule with C_{2v} symmetry point group. A valence bond theory approach considering just s and p orbitals would describe the bonding in terms of resonance between two resonance structures.

Two resonance structures of sulfur dioxide

The sulfur–oxygen bond has a bond order of 1.5. There is support for this simple approach that does not invoke d orbital participation. In terms of electron-counting formalism, the sulfur atom has an oxidation state of +4 and a formal charge of +1.

== Occurrence ==
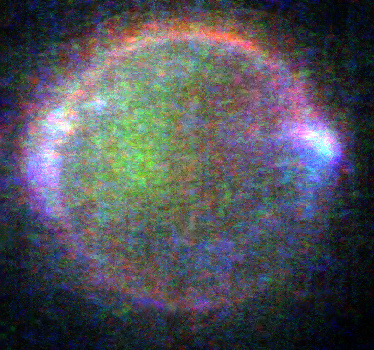
The blue auroral glows of Io's upper atmosphere are caused by volcanic sulfur dioxide.

Sulfur dioxide is found on Earth and exists in very small concentrations in the atmosphere at about 15 ppb.

On other planets, sulfur dioxide can be found in various concentrations, the most significant being the atmosphere of Venus, where it is the third-most abundant atmospheric gas at 150 ppm. There, it reacts with water to form clouds of sulfurous acid (SO_{2} + H_{2}O ⇌ HSO^{−}_{3} + H^{+}), and is a key component of the planet's global atmospheric sulfur cycle. It has been implicated as a key agent in the warming of early Mars, with estimates of concentrations in the lower atmosphere as high as 100 ppm, though it only exists in trace amounts. On both Venus and Mars, as on Earth, its primary source is thought to be volcanic. The atmosphere of Io, a natural satellite of Jupiter, is 90% sulfur dioxide and trace amounts are thought to also exist in the atmosphere of Jupiter. The James Webb Space Telescope has observed the presence of sulfur dioxide on the exoplanet WASP-39b, where it is formed through photochemistry in the planet's atmosphere.

As an ice, it is thought to exist in abundance on the Galilean moons—as subliming ice or frost on the trailing hemisphere of Io, and in the crust and mantle of Europa, Ganymede, and Callisto, possibly also in liquid form and readily reacting with water.

== Production ==
Sulfur dioxide is primarily produced for sulfuric acid manufacture (see contact process, but other processes predated that at least since 16th century). In the United States in 1979, 23.6 million metric tons (26 million U.S. short tons) of sulfur dioxide were used in this way, compared with 150,000 metric tons (165,347 U.S. short tons) used for other purposes. Most sulfur dioxide is produced by the combustion of elemental sulfur. Some sulfur dioxide is also produced by roasting pyrite and other sulfide ores in air.

An experiment showing burning of sulfur in oxygen. A flow-chamber joined to a gas washing bottle (filled with a solution of methyl orange) is being used. The product is sulfur dioxide (SO_{2}) with some traces of sulfur trioxide (SO_{3}). The "smoke" that exits the gas washing bottle is, in fact, a sulfuric acid fog generated in the reaction.

=== Combustion routes ===
Sulfur dioxide is the product of the burning of sulfur or of burning materials that contain sulfur:

S_{8} + 8 O_{2} → 8 SO_{2}, ΔH = −297 kJ/mol

To aid combustion, liquified sulfur (140–150 °C (284–302 °F) is sprayed through an atomizing nozzle to generate fine drops of sulfur with a large surface area. The reaction is exothermic, and the combustion produces temperatures of 1,000–1,600 °C (1,830–2,910 °F). The significant amount of heat produced is recovered by steam generation that can subsequently be converted to electricity.

The combustion of hydrogen sulfide and organosulfur compounds proceeds similarly. For example:

2 H_{2}S + 3 O_{2} → 2 SO_{2} + 2 H_{2}O

The roasting of sulfide ores such as pyrite, sphalerite, and cinnabar (mercury sulfide) also releases SO_{2}:

4 FeS_{2} + 11 O_{2} → 2 Fe_{2}O_{3} + 8 SO_{2}
2 ZnS + 3 O_{2} → 2 ZnO + 2 SO_{2}
HgS + O_{2} → Hg + SO_{2}
4 FeS + 7 O_{2} → 2 Fe_{2}O_{3} + 4 SO_{2}

A combination of these reactions is responsible for the largest source of sulfur dioxide, volcanic eruptions. These events can release millions of tons of SO_{2}.

=== Reduction of higher oxides ===
Sulfur dioxide can also be a byproduct in the manufacture of calcium silicate cement; CaSO_{4} is heated with coke and sand in this process:

2 CaSO_{4} + 2 SiO_{2} + C → 2 CaSiO_{3} + 2 SO_{2} + CO_{2}

Until the 1970s commercial quantities of sulfuric acid and cement were produced by this process in Whitehaven, England. Upon being mixed with shale or marl, and roasted, the sulfate liberated sulfur dioxide gas, used in sulfuric acid production, the reaction also produced calcium silicate, a precursor in cement production.

On a laboratory scale, the action of hot concentrated sulfuric acid on copper turnings produces sulfur dioxide.

Cu + 2 H_{2}SO_{4} → CuSO_{4} + SO_{2} + 2 H_{2}O

Tin also reacts with concentrated sulfuric acid but it produces tin(II) sulfate which can later be pyrolyzed at 360 °C into tin dioxide and dry sulfur dioxide.

Sn + H_{2}SO_{4} → SnSO_{4} + H_{2}
SnSO_{4} → SnO_{2} + SO_{2}

=== From base adducts ===
Sulfites release SO_{2} upon acidification:

H^{+} + HSO^{−}_{3} → SO_{2} + H_{2}O

Analogously, DABCO·2SO_{2} can be used as a solid source of SO_{2}.

== Reactions ==
Sulfites result by the action of aqueous base on sulfur dioxide:

SO_{2} + 2 NaOH → Na_{2}SO_{3} + H_{2}O

Sulfur dioxide is a mild but useful reducing agent. It is oxidized by halogens to give the sulfuryl halides, such as sulfuryl chloride:

SO_{2} + Cl_{2} → SO_{2}Cl_{2}

Sulfur dioxide is the oxidising agent in the Claus process, which is conducted on a large scale in oil refineries. Here, sulfur dioxide is reduced by hydrogen sulfide to give elemental sulfur:

SO_{2} + 2 H_{2}S → 3 S + 2 H_{2}O

The sequential oxidation of sulfur dioxide followed by its hydration is used in the production of sulfuric acid.

2 SO_{2} + 2 H_{2}O + O_{2} → 2 H_{2}SO_{4}

Sulfur dioxide dissolves in water to give "sulfurous acid", which cannot be isolated and is instead an acidic solution of bisulfite, and possibly sulfite, ions.

SO_{2} + H_{2}O ⇌ HSO^{−}_{3} + H^{+} K_{a} = 1.54×10^{−2}; pK_{a} = 1.81

=== Laboratory reactions ===
Sulfur dioxide is one of the few common acidic yet reducing gases. It turns moist litmus pink (being acidic), then white (due to its bleaching effect). It may be identified by bubbling it through a dichromate solution, turning the solution from orange to green (Cr^{3+} (aq)). It can also reduce ferric ions to ferrous.

Sulfur dioxide can react with certain 1,3-dienes in a cheletropic reaction to form cyclic sulfones. This reaction is exploited on an industrial scale for the synthesis of sulfolane, which is an important solvent in the petrochemical industry.

Sulfur dioxide can bind to metal ions as a ligand to form metal sulfur dioxide complexes, typically where the transition metal is in oxidation state 0 or +1. Many different bonding modes (geometries) are recognized, but in most cases, the ligand is monodentate, attached to the metal through sulfur, which can be either planar and pyramidal η^{1}. As a η^{1}-SO_{2} (S-bonded planar) ligand sulfur dioxide functions as a Lewis base using the lone pair on S. SO_{2} functions as a Lewis acids in its η^{1}-SO_{2} (S-bonded pyramidal) bonding mode with metals and in its 1:1 adducts with Lewis bases such as dimethylacetamide and trimethyl amine. When bonding to Lewis bases the acid parameters of SO_{2} are E_{A} = 0.51 and E_{A} = 1.56.

== Uses ==
The overarching, dominant use of sulfur dioxide is in the production of sulfuric acid.

=== Precursor to sulfuric acid ===
Sulfur dioxide is an intermediate in the production of sulfuric acid, being converted to sulfur trioxide, and then to oleum, which is made into sulfuric acid. Sulfur dioxide for this purpose is made when sulfur combines with oxygen. The method of converting sulfur dioxide to sulfuric acid is called the contact process. Several million tons are produced annually for this purpose.

=== Food preservative ===
Sulfur dioxide is sometimes used as a preservative for dried apricots, dried figs, and other dried fruits, owing to its antimicrobial properties and ability to prevent oxidation, and is called E220 when used in this way in Europe. As a preservative, it maintains the colorful appearance of the fruit and prevents rotting. Historically, molasses was "sulfured" as a preservative and also to lighten its color. Treatment of dried fruit was usually done outdoors, by igniting sublimed sulfur and burning in an enclosed space with the fruits. Fruits may be sulfured by dipping them into sodium bisulfite, sodium sulfite or sodium metabisulfite.

==== Winemaking ====
Sulfur dioxide was first used in winemaking by the Romans, when they discovered that burning sulfur candles inside empty wine vessels keeps them fresh and free from vinegar smell.

It is still an important compound in winemaking, and is measured in parts per million (ppm) in wine. It is present even in so-called unsulfurated wine at concentrations of up to 10 mg/L. It serves as an antibiotic and antioxidant, protecting wine from spoilage by bacteria and oxidation – a phenomenon that leads to the browning of the wine and a loss of cultivar specific flavors. Its antimicrobial action also helps minimize volatile acidity. Wines containing sulfur dioxide are typically labeled with "containing sulfites".

Sulfur dioxide exists in wine in free and bound forms, and the combinations are referred to as total SO_{2}. Binding, for instance to the carbonyl group of acetaldehyde, varies with the wine in question. The free form exists in equilibrium between molecular SO_{2} (as a dissolved gas) and bisulfite ion, which is in turn in equilibrium with sulfite ion. These equilibria depend on the pH of the wine. Lower pH shifts the equilibrium towards molecular (gaseous) SO_{2}, which is the active form, while at higher pH more SO_{2} is found in the inactive sulfite and bisulfite forms. The molecular SO_{2} is active as an antimicrobial and antioxidant, and this is also the form which may be perceived as a pungent odor at high levels. Wines with total SO_{2} concentrations below 10 ppm do not require "contains sulfites" on the label by US and EU laws. The upper limit of total SO_{2} allowed in wine in the US is 350 ppm; in the EU it is 160 ppm for red wines and 210 ppm for white and rosé wines. In low concentrations, SO_{2} is mostly undetectable in wine, but at free SO_{2} concentrations over 50 ppm, SO_{2} becomes evident in the smell and taste of wine.

SO_{2} is also a very important compound in winery sanitation. Wineries and equipment must be kept clean, and because bleach cannot be used in a winery due to the risk of cork taint, a mixture of SO_{2}, water, and citric acid is commonly used to clean and sanitize equipment. Ozone (O_{3}) is now used extensively for sanitizing in wineries due to its efficacy, and because it does not affect the wine or most equipment.

=== As a soaking agent ===
Aqueous sulfur dioxide solution is used in corn wet-milling, in the steeping stage of the process. The corn kernels are soaked in this solution in large tanks containing lactic acid and sulfur dioxide at around 53˚C (127˚F) temperature for nearly 40 hours. This is done to soften the kernel so that the oil in the germ will not contaminate other products and is easy to separate.

=== As a reducing agent ===
Sulfur dioxide is also a good reductant. In the presence of water, sulfur dioxide is able to decolorize substances. Specifically, it is a useful reducing bleach for papers and delicate materials such as clothes. This bleaching effect normally does not last very long. Oxygen in the atmosphere reoxidizes the reduced dyes, restoring the color. In municipal wastewater treatment, sulfur dioxide is used to treat chlorinated wastewater prior to release. Sulfur dioxide reduces free and combined chlorine to chloride.

Sulfur dioxide is fairly soluble in water, and by both IR and Raman spectroscopy; the hypothetical sulfurous acid, H_{2}SO_{3}, is not present to any extent. However, such solutions do show spectra of the hydrogen sulfite ion, HSO_{3}^{−}, by reaction with water, and it is in fact the actual reducing agent present:

SO_{2} + H_{2}O ⇌ HSO_{3}^{−} + H^{+}

=== As a fumigant ===
In the beginning of the 20th century sulfur dioxide was used in Buenos Aires as a fumigant to kill rats that carried the Yersinia pestis bacterium, which causes bubonic plague. The application was successful, and the application of this method was extended to other areas in South America. In Buenos Aires, where these apparatuses were known as Sulfurozador, but later also in Rio de Janeiro, New Orleans and San Francisco, the sulfur dioxide treatment machines were brought into the streets to enable extensive disinfection campaigns, with effective results.

=== Biochemical and biomedical roles ===
Sulfur dioxide or its conjugate base bisulfite is produced biologically as an intermediate in both sulfate-reducing organisms and in sulfur-oxidizing bacteria, as well. The role of sulfur dioxide in mammalian biology is not yet well understood. Sulfur dioxide blocks nerve signals from the pulmonary stretch receptors and abolishes the Hering–Breuer inflation reflex.

It is considered that endogenous sulfur dioxide plays a significant physiological role in regulating cardiac and blood vessel function, and aberrant or deficient sulfur dioxide metabolism can contribute to several different cardiovascular diseases, such as arterial hypertension, atherosclerosis, pulmonary arterial hypertension, and stenocardia.

It was shown that in children with pulmonary arterial hypertension due to congenital heart diseases the level of homocysteine is higher and the level of endogenous sulfur dioxide is lower than in normal control children. Moreover, these biochemical parameters strongly correlated to the severity of pulmonary arterial hypertension. Authors considered homocysteine to be one of useful biochemical markers of disease severity and sulfur dioxide metabolism to be one of potential therapeutic targets in those patients.

Endogenous sulfur dioxide also has been shown to lower the proliferation rate of endothelial smooth muscle cells in blood vessels, via lowering the MAPK activity and activating adenylyl cyclase and protein kinase A. Smooth muscle cell proliferation is one of important mechanisms of hypertensive remodeling of blood vessels and their stenosis, so it is an important pathogenetic mechanism in arterial hypertension and atherosclerosis.

Endogenous sulfur dioxide in low concentrations causes endothelium-dependent vasodilation. In higher concentrations it causes endothelium-independent vasodilation and has a negative inotropic effect on cardiac output function, thus effectively lowering blood pressure and myocardial oxygen consumption. The vasodilating and bronchodilating effects of sulfur dioxide are mediated via ATP-dependent calcium channels and L-type ("dihydropyridine") calcium channels. Endogenous sulfur dioxide is also a potent antiinflammatory, antioxidant and cytoprotective agent. It lowers blood pressure and slows hypertensive remodeling of blood vessels, especially thickening of their intima. It also regulates lipid metabolism.

Endogenous sulfur dioxide also diminishes myocardial damage, caused by isoproterenol adrenergic hyperstimulation, and strengthens the myocardial antioxidant defense reserve.

=== As a reagent and solvent in the laboratory ===
Sulfur dioxide is a versatile inert solvent widely used for dissolving highly oxidizing salts. It is also used occasionally as a source of the sulfonyl group in organic synthesis. Treatment of aryl diazonium salts with sulfur dioxide and cuprous chloride yields the corresponding aryl sulfonyl chloride, for example:

As a result of its very low Lewis basicity, it is often used as a low-temperature solvent/diluent for superacids like magic acid (FSO_{3}H/SbF_{5}), allowing for highly reactive species like tert-butyl cation to be observed spectroscopically at low temperature (though tertiary carbocations do react with SO_{2} above about −30 °C, and even less reactive solvents like SO_{2}ClF must be used at these higher temperatures).

=== As a refrigerant ===
Sulfur dioxide was one of the earliest refrigerants adopted for mechanical refrigeration owing to its ease of liquefaction and high latent heat of vaporization. In 1784, Jean-François Clouet and Gaspard Monge first demonstrated that sulfur dioxide gas could be liquefied at low temperatures. In the mid-1870s, Raoul Pictet successfully employed sulfur dioxide in a prototype refrigeration system. Beginning in 1920, it saw widespread use in the "Rollator" rotary-compressor home refrigerators produced by Norge. Following the introduction of less toxic, non-flammable chlorofluorocarbon (CFC) refrigerants, the use of sulfur dioxide in refrigeration systems gradually declined.

=== As an indicator of volcanic activity ===
Sulfur dioxide content in naturally-released geothermal gasses is measured by the Icelandic Meteorological Office as an indicator of possible volcanic activity.

== Safety ==
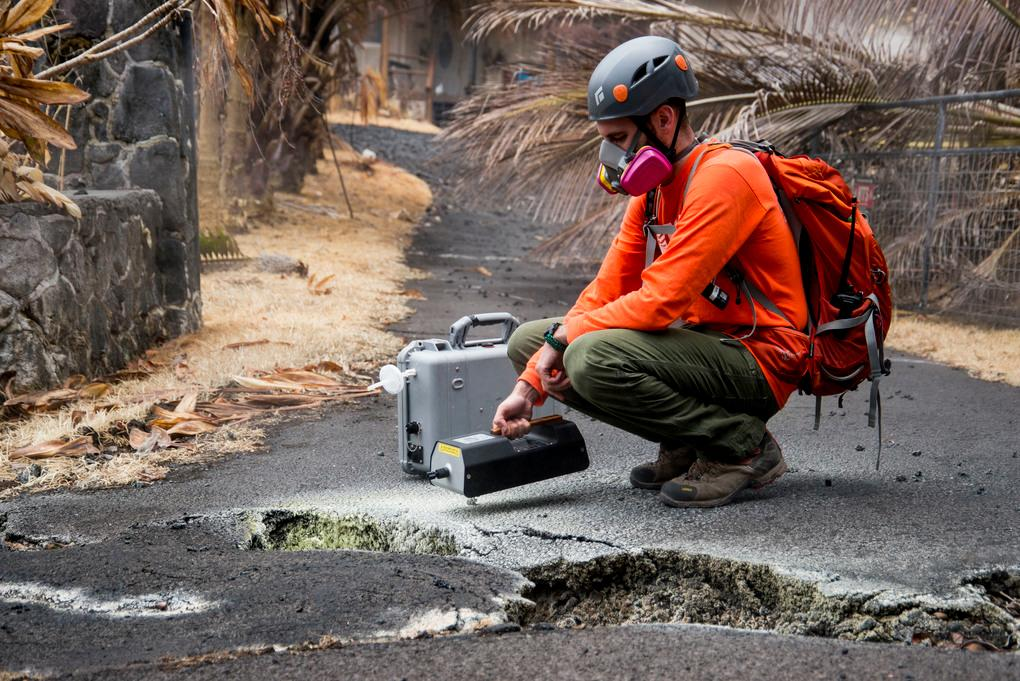
US Geological Survey volunteer tests for sulfur dioxide after the 2018 lower Puna eruption.

=== Ingestion ===
In the United States, the Center for Science in the Public Interest lists the two food preservatives, sulfur dioxide and sodium bisulfite, as being safe for human consumption except for certain asthmatic individuals who may be sensitive to them, especially in large amounts. Symptoms of sensitivity to sulfiting agents, including sulfur dioxide, manifest as potentially life-threatening trouble breathing within minutes of ingestion. Sulfites may also cause symptoms in non-asthmatic individuals, namely dermatitis, urticaria, flushing, hypotension, abdominal pain and diarrhea, and even life-threatening anaphylaxis.

=== Inhalation ===
Incidental exposure to sulfur dioxide is routine, e.g. the smoke from matches, coal, and sulfur-containing fuels like bunker fuel. Relative to other chemicals, it is only mildly toxic and requires high concentrations to be actively hazardous. However, its ubiquity makes it a major air pollutant with significant impacts on human health.

In 2008, the American Conference of Governmental Industrial Hygienists reduced the short-term exposure limit to 0.25 parts per million (ppm). In the US, the OSHA set the PEL at 5 ppm (13 mg/m^{3}) time-weighted average. Also in the US, NIOSH set the IDLH at 100 ppm. In 2010, the EPA "revised the primary SO_{2} NAAQS by establishing a new one-hour standard at a level of 75 parts per billion (ppb). EPA revoked the two existing primary standards because they would not provide additional public health protection given a one-hour standard at 75 ppb."

== Environmental role ==
=== Air pollution ===
The effect of major volcanic eruptions on sulfate aerosol concentrations and chemical reactions in the atmosphere

Major volcanic eruptions have an overwhelming effect on sulfate aerosol concentrations in the years when they occur: eruptions ranking 4 or greater on the Volcanic Explosivity Index inject SO_{2} and water vapor directly into the stratosphere, where they react to create sulfate aerosol plumes. Volcanic emissions vary significantly in composition, and have complex chemistry due to the presence of ash particulates and a wide variety of other elements in the plume. Only stratovolcanoes containing primarily felsic magmas are responsible for these fluxes, as mafic magma erupted in shield volcanoes doesn't result in plumes which reach the stratosphere. However, before the Industrial Revolution, dimethyl sulfide pathway was the largest contributor to sulfate aerosol concentrations in a more average year with no major volcanic activity. According to the IPCC First Assessment Report, published in 1990, volcanic emissions usually amounted to around 10 million tons in 1980s, while dimethyl sulfide amounted to 40 million tons. Yet, by that point, the global human-caused emissions of sulfur into the atmosphere became "at least as large" as all natural emissions of sulfur-containing compounds combined: they were at less than 3 million tons per year in 1860, and then they increased to 15 million tons in 1900, 40 million tons in 1940 and about 80 millions in 1980. The same report noted that "in the industrialized regions of Europe and North America, anthropogenic emissions dominate over natural emissions by about a factor of ten or even more". In the eastern United States in the early 2000s, sulfate particles were estimated to account for 25% or more of all air pollution. Exposure to sulfur dioxide emissions by coal power plants (coal PM_{2.5}) in the US was associated with 2.1 times greater mortality risk than exposure to PM_{2.5} from all sources. Meanwhile, the Southern Hemisphere had much lower concentrations due to being much less densely populated, with an estimated 90% of the human population in the north. In the early 1990s, anthropogenic sulfur dominated in the Northern Hemisphere, where only 16% of annual sulfur emissions were natural, yet amounted for less than half of the emissions in the Southern Hemisphere.

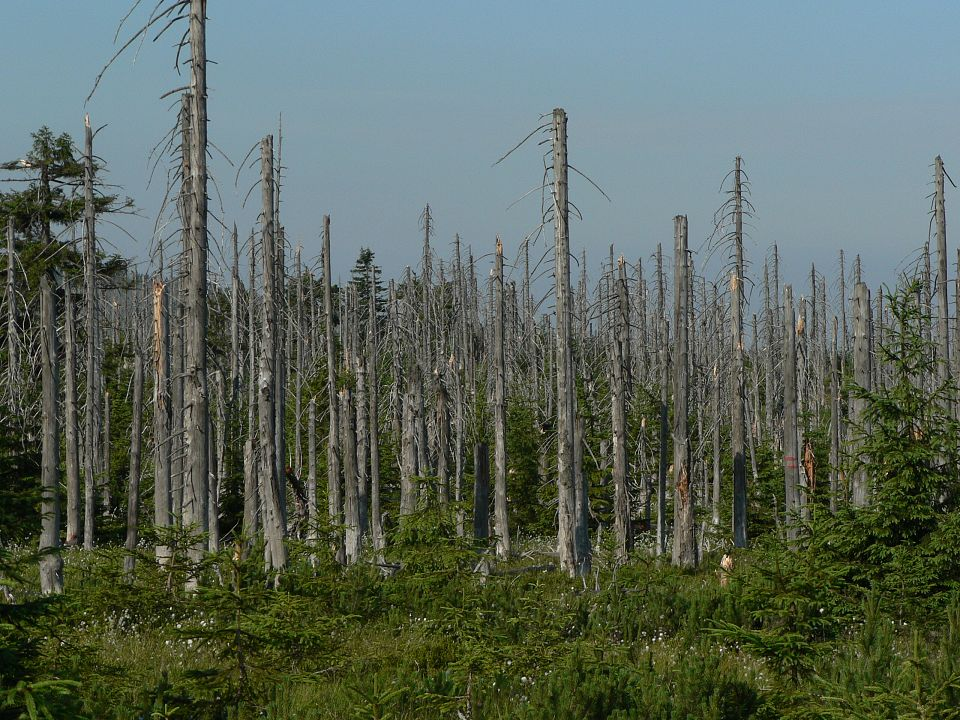
Acid rain-damaged forest in Europe's Black Triangle

Such an increase in sulfate aerosol emissions had a variety of effects. At the time, the most visible one was acid rain, caused by precipitation from clouds carrying high concentrations of sulfate aerosols in the troposphere. At its peak, acid rain has eliminated brook trout and some other fish species and insect life from lakes and streams in geographically sensitive areas, such as Adirondack Mountains in the United States. Acid rain worsens soil function as some of its microbiota is lost and heavy metals like aluminium are mobilized (spread more easily) while essential nutrients and minerals such as magnesium can leach away because of the same. Ultimately, plants unable to tolerate lowered pH are killed, with montane forests being some of the worst-affected ecosystems due to their regular exposure to sulfate-carrying fog at high altitudes. While acid rain was too dilute to affect human health directly, breathing smog or even any air with elevated sulfate concentrations is known to contribute to heart and lung conditions, including asthma and bronchitis. Further, this form of pollution is linked to preterm birth and low birth weight, with a study of 74,671 pregnant women in Beijing finding that every additional 100 μg/m^{3} of SO_{2} in the air reduced infants' weight by 7.3 g, making it and other forms of air pollution the largest attributable risk factor for low birth weight ever observed.

==== Control measures ====
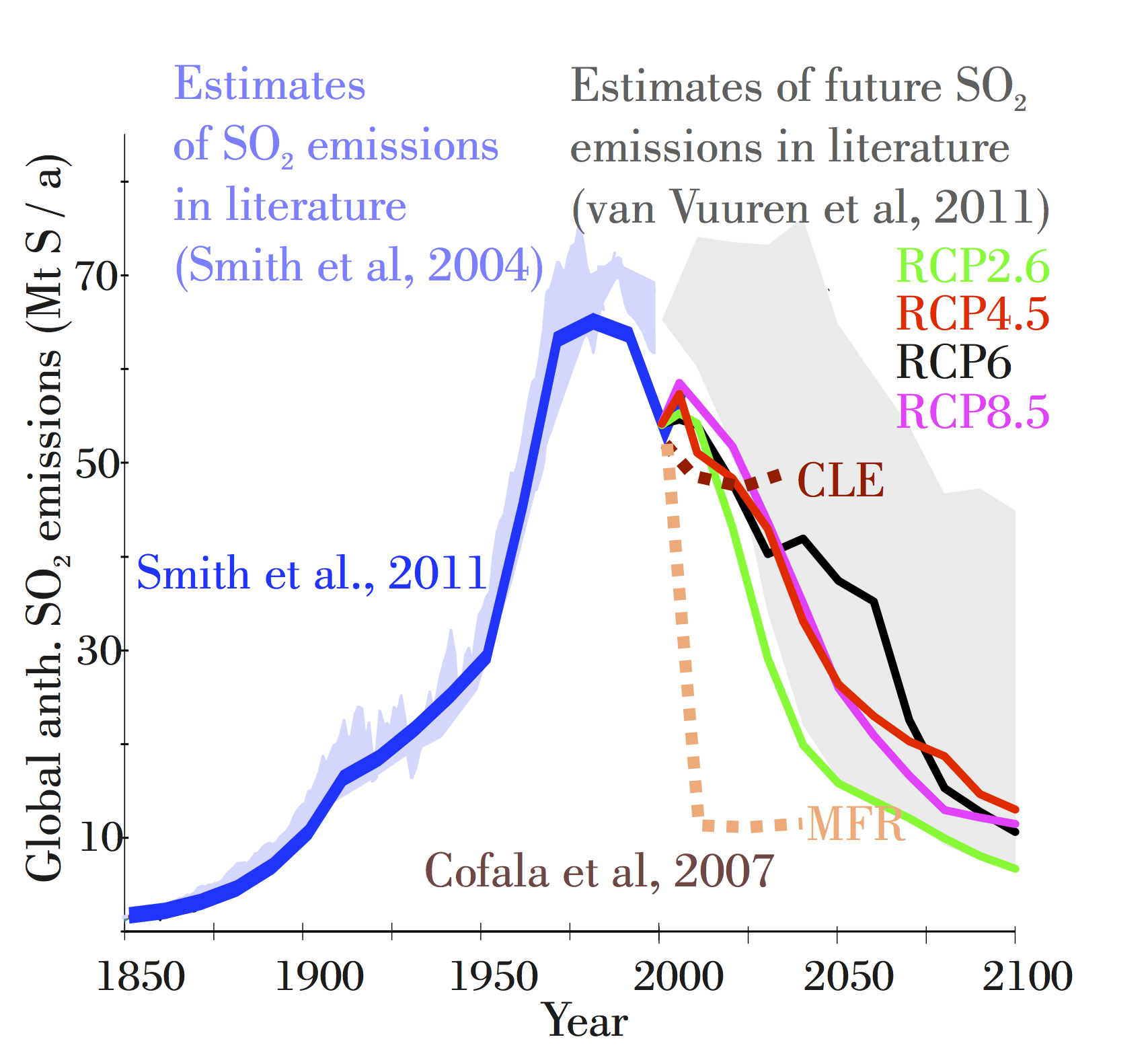
Early 2010s estimates of past and future anthropogenic global sulfur dioxide emissions, including the Representative Concentration Pathways. While no climate change scenario may reach Maximum Feasible Reductions (MFRs), all assume steep declines from today's levels. By 2019, sulfate emission reductions were confirmed to proceed at a very fast rate.

Due largely to the US EPA's Acid Rain Program, the U.S. has had a 33% decrease in emissions between 1983 and 2002 (see table). This improvement resulted in part from flue-gas desulfurization, a technology that enables SO_{2} to be chemically bound in power plants burning sulfur-containing coal or petroleum.

Year	SO_{2}
1970	31,161,000 short tons (28.3 Mt)
1980	25,905,000 short tons (23.5 Mt)
1990	23,678,000 short tons (21.5 Mt)
1996	18,859,000 short tons (17.1 Mt)
1997	19,363,000 short tons (17.6 Mt)
1998	19,491,000 short tons (17.7 Mt)
1999	18,867,000 short tons (17.1 Mt)

In particular, calcium oxide (lime) reacts with sulfur dioxide to form calcium sulfite:

CaO + SO_{2} → CaSO_{3}

Aerobic oxidation of the CaSO_{3} gives CaSO_{4}, anhydrite. Most gypsum sold in Europe comes from flue-gas desulfurization.

To control sulfur emissions, dozens of methods with relatively high efficiencies have been developed for fitting of coal-fired power plants. Sulfur can be removed from coal during burning by using limestone as a bed material in fluidized bed combustion.

Global sulfur dioxide (SO₂) emissions by world region

Sulfur can also be removed from fuels before burning, preventing formation of SO_{2} when the fuel is burnt. The Claus process is used in refineries to produce sulfur as a byproduct. The Stretford process has also been used to remove sulfur from fuel. Redox processes using iron oxides can also be used, for example, Lo-Cat or Sulferox.

Fuel additives such as calcium additives and magnesium carboxylate may be used in marine engines to lower the emission of sulfur dioxide gases into the atmosphere.

=== Effects on ozone layer ===
Sulfur dioxide aerosols in the stratosphere can contribute to ozone depletion in the presence of chlorofluorocarbons and other halogenated ozone-depleting substances. The effects of volcanic eruptions containing sulfur dioxide aerosols on the ozone layer are complex, however. In the absence of anthropogenic or biogenic halogenated compounds in the lower stratosphere, depletion of dinitrogen pentoxide in the middle stratosphere associated with its reactivity to the aerosols can promote ozone formation. Injection of sulfur dioxide and large amounts of water vapor into the stratosphere following the 2022 eruption of Hunga Tonga-Hunga Haʻapai resulted in altered atmospheric circulation that promoted a decrease in ozone in the southern latitudes but an increase in the tropics. The additional presence of hydrochloric acid in eruptions can result in net ozone depletion.

=== Impact on climate change ===
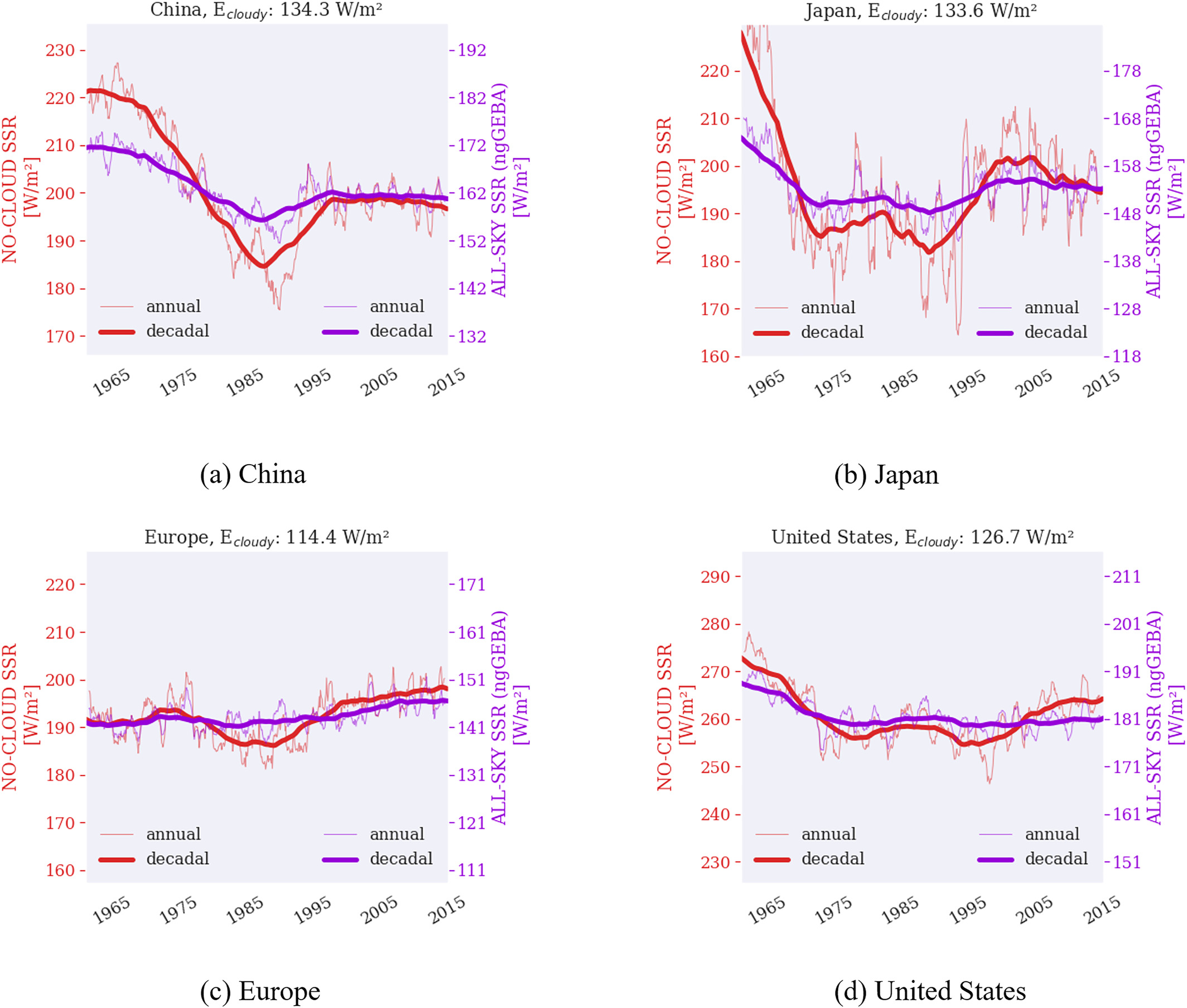
The observed trends of global dimming and brightening in four major geographic regions. The dimming was greater on the average cloud-free days (red line) than on the average of all days (purple line), strongly suggesting that sulfate aerosols were the cause.

Subsequent research estimated an average reduction in sunlight striking the terrestrial surface of around 4–5% per decade over the late 1950s–1980s, and 2–3% per decade when 1990s were included. Notably, solar radiation at the top of the atmosphere did not vary by more than 0.1–0.3% in all that time, strongly suggesting that the reasons for the dimming were on Earth. Additionally, only visible light and infrared radiation were dimmed, rather than the ultraviolet part of the spectrum. Further, the dimming had occurred even when the skies were clear, and it was in fact stronger than during the cloudy days, proving that it was not caused by changes in cloud cover alone.

==== Projected impacts ====
The extent to which physical factors in the atmosphere or on land affect climate change, including the cooling provided by sulfate aerosols and the dimming they cause. The large error bar shows that there are still substantial unresolved uncertainties.

Since changes in aerosol concentrations already have an impact on the global climate, they would necessarily influence future projections as well. In fact, it is impossible to fully estimate the warming impact of all greenhouse gases without accounting for the counteracting cooling from aerosols.

Regardless of the current strength of aerosol cooling, all future climate change scenarios project decreases in particulates and this includes the scenarios where 1.5 °C (2.7 °F) and 2 °C (3.6 °F) targets are met: their specific emission reduction targets assume the need to make up for lower dimming. Since models estimate that the cooling caused by sulfates is largely equivalent to the warming caused by atmospheric methane (and since methane is a relatively short-lived greenhouse gas), it is believed that simultaneous reductions in both would effectively cancel each other out. Yet, in the recent years, methane concentrations had been increasing at rates exceeding their previous period of peak growth in the 1980s, with wetland methane emissions driving much of the recent growth, while air pollution is getting cleaned up aggressively. These trends are some of the main reasons why 1.5 °C (2.7 °F) warming is now expected around 2030, as opposed to the mid-2010s estimates where it would not occur until 2040.

==== Solar geoengineering ====
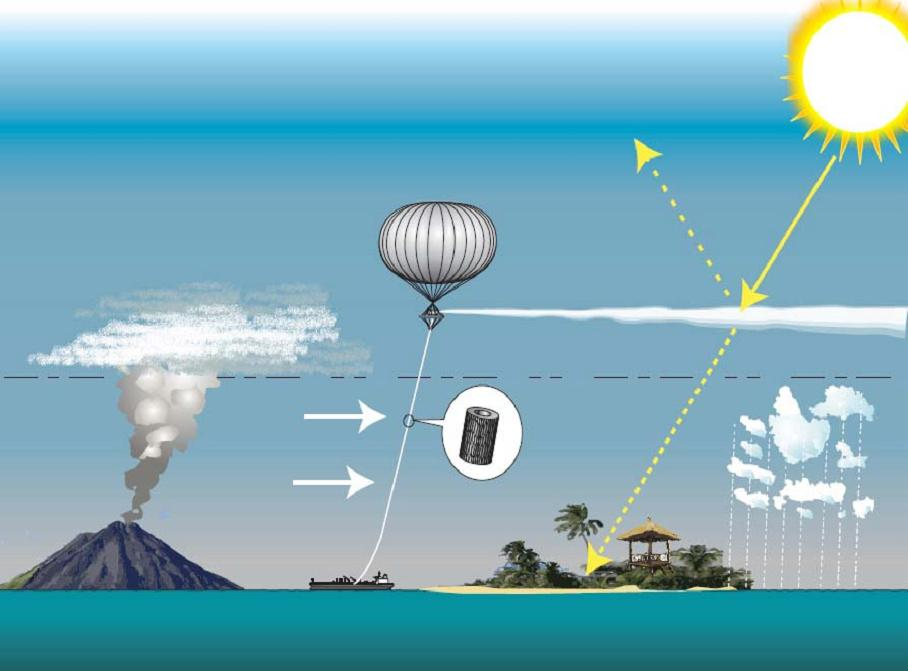
Proposed tethered balloon to inject aerosols into the stratosphere

As the real world had shown the importance of sulfate aerosol concentrations to the global climate, research into the subject accelerated. Formation of the aerosols and their effects on the atmosphere can be studied in the lab, with methods like ion-chromatography and mass spectrometry Samples of actual particles can be recovered from the stratosphere using balloons or aircraft, and remote satellites were also used for observation. This data is fed into the climate models, as the necessity of accounting for aerosol cooling to truly understand the rate and evolution of warming had long been apparent, with the IPCC Second Assessment Report being the first to include an estimate of their impact on climate, and every major model able to simulate them by the time IPCC Fourth Assessment Report was published in 2007. Many scientists also see the other side of this research, which is learning how to cause the same effect artificially. While discussed around the 1990s, if not earlier, stratospheric aerosol injection as a solar geoengineering method is best associated with Paul Crutzen's detailed 2006 proposal. Deploying in the stratosphere ensures that the aerosols are at their most effective, and that the progress of clean air measures would not be reversed: more recent research estimated that even under the highest-emission scenario RCP 8.5, the addition of stratospheric sulfur required to avoid 4 °C (7.2 °F) relative to now (and 5 °C (9.0 °F) relative to the preindustrial) would be effectively offset by the future controls on tropospheric sulfate pollution, and the amount required would be even less for less drastic warming scenarios. This spurred a detailed look at its costs and benefits, but even with hundreds of studies into the subject completed by the early 2020s, some notable uncertainties remain.

== Properties ==
Table of thermal and physical properties of saturated liquid sulfur dioxide:

Temperature (°C)	Density (kg/m^3)	Specific heat (kJ/kg K)	Kinematic viscosity (m^2/s)	Conductivity (W/m K)	Thermal diffusivity (m^2/s)	Prandtl Number	Bulk modulus (K^-1)
−50	1560.84	1.3595	4.84E-07	0.242	1.14E-07	4.24	–
−40	1536.81	1.3607	4.24E-07	0.235	1.13E-07	3.74	–
−30	1520.64	1.3616	3.71E-07	0.23	1.12E-07	3.31	–
−20	1488.6	1.3624	3.24E-07	0.225	1.11E-07	2.93	–
−10	1463.61	1.3628	2.88E-07	0.218	1.10E-07	2.62	–
0	1438.46	1.3636	2.57E-07	0.211	1.08E-07	2.38	–
10	1412.51	1.3645	2.32E-07	0.204	1.07E-07	2.18	–
20	1386.4	1.3653	2.10E-07	0.199	1.05E-07	2	1.94E-03
30	1359.33	1.3662	1.90E-07	0.192	1.04E-07	1.83	–
40	1329.22	1.3674	1.73E-07	0.185	1.02E-07	1.7	–
50	1299.1	1.3683	1.62E-07	0.177	9.99E-08	1.61	–

== See also ==
- Bunker fuel
- National Ambient Air Quality Standards
- Sulfur trioxide
- Sulfur–iodine cycle
