= Ewald Hering =

German physiologist (1834–1918)

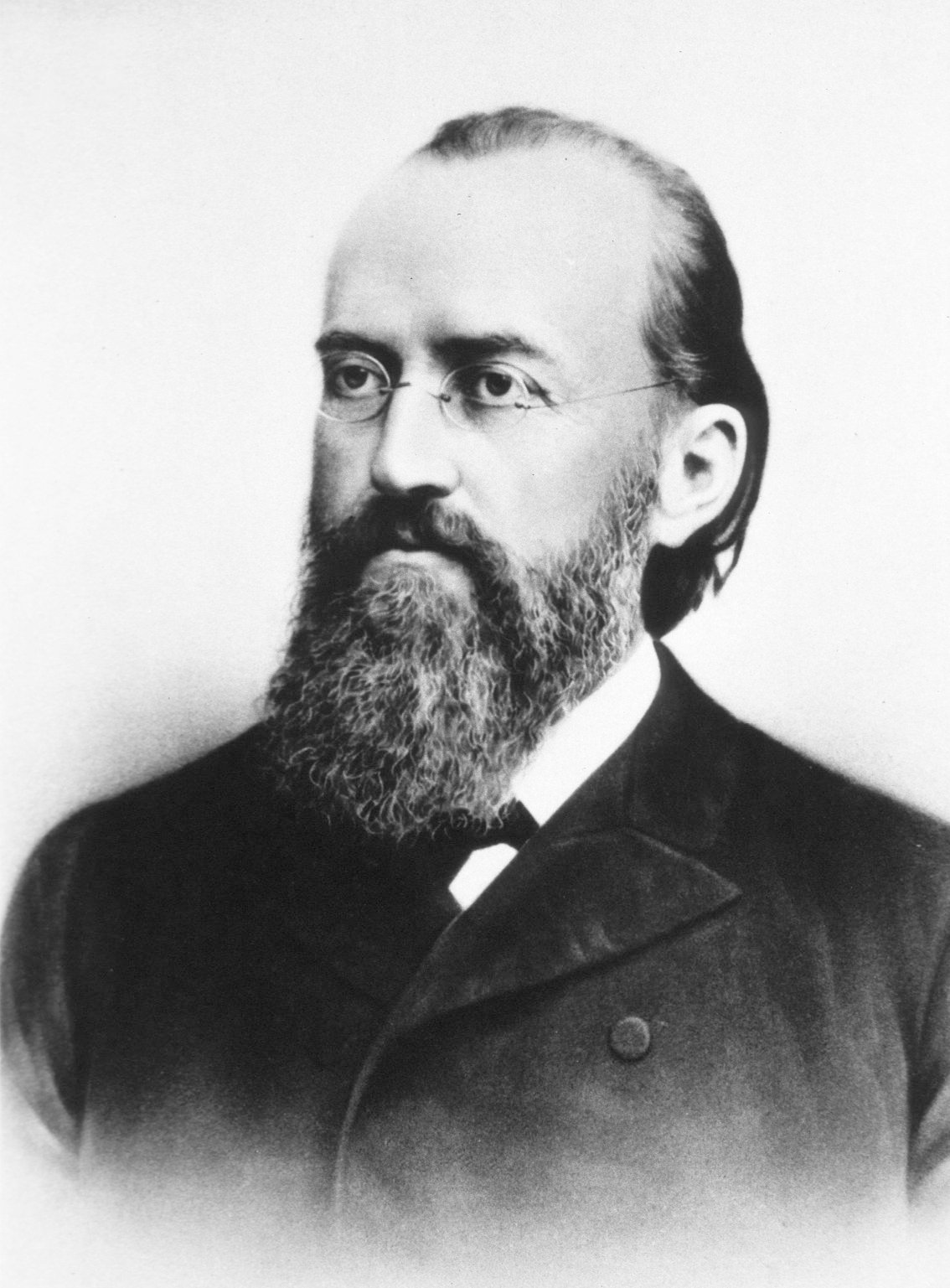
- Born: 5 August 1834; Alt-Gersdorf, Kingdom of Saxony
- Died: 26 January 1918 (aged 83); Leipzig, Kingdom of Saxony
- Education: Leipzig University
- Known for: Canals of Hering; Hering illusion Hering–Breuer reflex Hering–Hillebrand deviation Hering's law of visual direction Hering's law of equal innervation Traube–Hering–Mayer waves Hyperacuity; Opponent-process theory Organic memory+
- Awards: Pour le Mérite (1911); ForMemRS (1902)
- Scientific career
- Fields: Physiology

Karl Ewald Konstantin Hering (5 August 1834 – 26 January 1918) was a German physiologist who did much research in color vision, binocular perception, eye movements, and hyperacuity. He proposed opponent color theory in 1892.

Born in Alt-Gersdorf, Kingdom of Saxony, Hering studied at the University of Leipzig and became the first rector of the German Charles-Ferdinand University in Prague.

== Biography ==
=== Early years ===
Hering was born in Alt-Gersdorf in Saxony, Germany. He probably grew up in a poor family, son of a Lutheran pastor. Hering attended gymnasium in Zittau and entered the university of Leipzig in 1853. There he studied philosophy, zoology and medicine. He completed an M.D. degree in 1860.

It is somewhat unclear how Hering trained to do research. At the time Johannes Peter Müller was perhaps the most famous physiologist in Germany. Hering seems to have applied for studying under his direction but was rejected, which might have contributed to his animosity towards Hermann von Helmholtz, Müller's protégé. However, in Leipzig, E. H. Weber and G. T. Fechner were conducting groundbreaking studies founding what would become the field of psychophysics. Although there is no evidence that Hering ever studied under their direction, in his later years he proudly acknowledged himself a "student of Fechner".

After graduating, Hering practiced as a physician in Leipzig. Despite having little time to do research and having even scarcer financial resources, he turned to binocular vision (using both eyes together) and the problem of the horopter (the points in space that project on anatomically identical points on the two retinas). There, he surprised the scientific community when he published, as a completely unknown scientist, his own mathematical derivation of the horopter independently from Hermann von Helmholtz, who was by then considered one of the best German scientists and mathematicians. Hering went as far as ridiculing Helmholtz's (unimportant) mathematical errors in his derivation of the horopter.

=== University posts ===
Hering was subsequently appointed professor of physiology at the military academy of Vienna until 1870. With better resources he conducted important studies in physiology, in particular on the cardiac and respiratory systems. In 1870, he succeeded Jan Evangelista Purkinje at the university of Prague where he remained for the next 25 years. There he became involved in fierce arguments between nationalistic Czechs who wanted the university taught in the language of the land, and a minority of German professors. Eventually a separate German university, Charles-Ferdinand University, was created in 1882 and Hering became its first rector.

In his late years, Hering returned to Germany, where he became professor at the university of Leipzig in 1895, aged 61. He retired in 1915 and died of tuberculosis three years later. He was an atheist.

== Research ==
=== Binocular vision ===
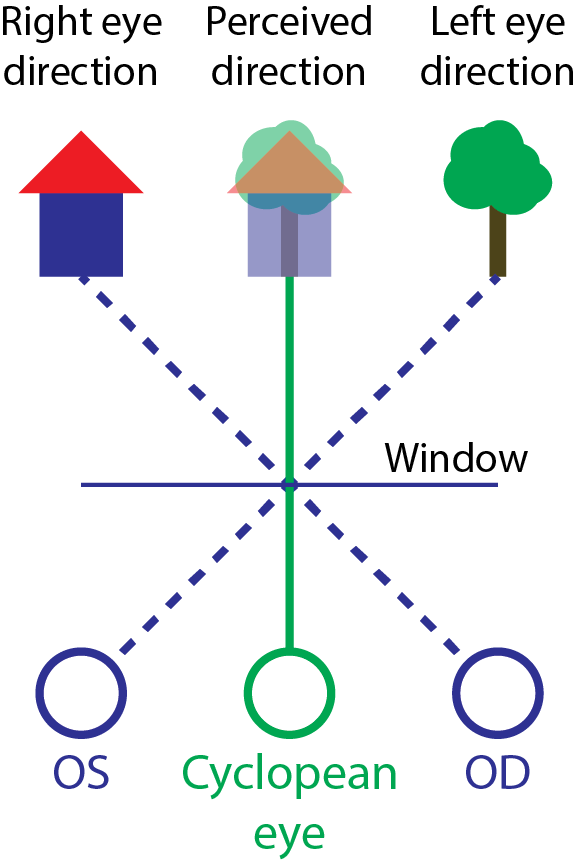
Hering's demonstration of his law of visual direction

Hering studied a broad range of subjects in vision, among them his outstanding studies on binocular vision. He derived, almost simultaneously with Helmholtz, the theoretical shape of the horopter. Despite identical results, Hering's derivation was far more modern and elegant, using recently developed projective geometry. Indeed, Helmholtz himself qualified Hering's approach as "very elegant, comprehensive and complete". Subsequently, Hering empirically estimated the shape of the horopter. Alongside with Helmholtz and Hillebrand, he noticed that the empirical horopter does not match the theoretical horopter, a phenomenon now named the Hering–Hillebrand deviation.

Hering is also well known for his Law of Visual Direction which describes the perceived egocentric direction of an object from an observer. Unbeknownst to Hering and other visual scientists of the time, a similar law had been proposed by Alhazen (1021) and Wells (1792) although both their laws were different.

=== Hyperacuity ===
Ewald Hering's model of how a Vernier acuity stimulus is coded by a receptor array. Receptors marked c signal a different position code along the horizontal direction from either the position a code or the position b code.

Hering did seminal work on what we now call hyperacuity: spatial resolution in certain visual tasks that exceeds visual acuity by about an order of magnitude. In his famous 1899 treatise "On the Limits of Visual Acuity" he summarized empirical data published 1863 by Alfred Wilhelm Volkmann and Ernst Anton Wülfing 1892 who found that there are visual tasks in which spatial resolution goes well below the size of receptor cells in the central retina. In an explanatory model, Hering superimposed a Vernier acuity stimulus – a disalignment among two line segments – onto an idealized receptor array. He argued that, by a mechanism of integration across small eye movements, the location information signalled by the involved receptors is coded to a much higher precision than would be possible by a single receptor, an explanation that still holds up today.

=== Eye movements ===
Depiction of predictions for refoveating Muller's stimulus with eyes moving independently or eyes following Hering's law of equal innervation

Hering further studied eye movements. He developed the Hering's law of equal innervation to describe the conjugacy of eye movements in animals. According to this law eye movements are always equal in intensity in the two eyes but not in direction. Eye movements can therefore be either conjugate (in the same direction such as saccades or smooth pursuit) or disjunctive (such as vergence eye movements). Hering's law of equal innervation is best described by Müller's stimulus where the fixation point changes position in 1 eye but not the other eye. Simplicity conducts that only the misaligned eye should move to refoveate. Hering's law predicts that because the eyes must always move by equal amounts, both eyes should move in the new binocular direction of the target (see Hering's law of visual direction above), then move in opposite direction to adjust vergence to that of the target. In other words, the eye in which the target did not move will move away and then back at the target. This prediction was experimentally confirmed by Yarbus in his seminal work on eye movements. However it is now known that strong deviations from Hering's law exist.

=== Color theory ===
Hering disagreed with the leading theory developed primarily by Thomas Young, James Clerk Maxwell and Hermann von Helmholtz. Young proposed that color vision is based on three primary colors: red, green, and blue. Maxwell demonstrated that any color can be matched by a mixture of three primary colors. This was interpreted by Helmholtz as proof that humans perceive colors through three types of receptors, while white and black would reflect the amount of light.

Hering instead held that the visual system works based on a system of color opponency. His evidence stemmed from color-adaptation experiments and the linguistic observation that certain color names cannot be combined into one. In this model, colors are perceived through mechanisms sensitive to three pairs of opponent colors: red-green, yellow-blue and white-black.

Johannes von Kries published in 1905 the zone theory that synthesizes both descriptions as one, where the Young-Helmholtz theory describes the interaction of light with receptors and Hering the image processing stage. Later, in 1925, Erwin Schrödinger published a paper inspired by von Kries, titled On the relation of the four color to the three color theory. There he probes a formal relationship between the two color theories.

Both theories have solid empirical evidence. The conundrum was resolved by the discovery of color-opponent ganglion cells in the retina and lateral geniculate nucleus. We now know that the human eye possesses three types of color-sensitive receptors (as proposed by Young, Maxwell, and Helmholtz) which then combine their signals in three color-opponent channels as proposed by Hering. Thus, both the Hering and Young-Helmholtz theories are correct.

=== Physiology ===
Hering made significant contributions to the field of physiology as well as psychology. In particular he demonstrated with his student Breuer the Hering–Breuer reflex, or that artificially inflating the lungs triggers an automatic signal triggering expiration. Then deflating the lungs in turns triggers a new signal inducing respiration. That is, inspirations and expirations are an endless reflex loop triggering each other. He also showed the Traube-Hering reflex, or that inflating the lungs triggers an acceleration of the heart.

=== Other research ===
The Hering illusion

In 1861, Hering described an optical illusion which now bears his name – the Hering illusion. When two straight and parallel lines are presented in front of radial background (similar to the spokes of a bicycle), the lines appear as if they were bowed outwards. The Orbison illusion is one of its variants, while the Wundt illusion produces a similar, but inverted effect.

Hering first suggested the idea of organic memory in an 1870 lecture for the Imperial Academy of Science in Vienna. Hering took influence from the idea of inheritance of acquired characteristics and suggested that memories could be passed on through generations by germ cells.

== The Hering-Helmholtz controversy ==
Hering spent most of his life arguing violently with Helmholtz. The controversy was not only scientific but also philosophical; Hering was a nativist, Helmholtz an empiricist. Helmholtz also came from a higher social class and was always considered a prodigy, whereas Hering had to go through a harder time in his early career. Hering and Helmholtz disagreed on almost everything and the controversy lasted long after the end of both of their lives. Hering however was by far the more aggressive of the two, and was always prompt to point out any mistake that Helmholtz might have made, sometimes even going so far as to insult him ("It is likely that the great Helmholtz in his dozing state..."). Helmholtz's faction (though probably not Helmholtz himself) spread rumors which accorded to Hering the need for help to do his mathematical work and that he was clinically insane ("He has been, as I have heard, mentally ill").

== Publications ==
- The Theory of Binocular Vision [Die Lehre Vom Binocularen Sehen] (1868/1977)
- Spatial Sense and Movements of the Eye [Der Raumsinn und die Bewegungen des Auges] (1879/1942)
- On the Limits of Visual Acuity. [Ueber die Grenzen der Sehschärfe] (1899/2018)
- Outlines of a Theory of the Light Sense [Grundzüge der Lehre vom Lichtsinn] (1905/1964)
- Handbuch der Physiologie (1879)
- On Memory and the Specific Energies of the Nervous System (1897)
