= Vernier acuity =

Type of visual acuity and hyperacuity

Animated vernier scale ("Nonius"): The lower rectangle is divided into 10 sections but is equal in length to 9 sections in the upper scale. It is used, e.g., in a vernier caliper.

Vernier acuity (from the term "vernier scale", named after astronomer Pierre Vernier) is a type of visual acuity – more precisely of hyperacuity – that measures the ability to discern a disalignment among two line segments or gratings. A subject's vernier (IPA: /ˈvɜːrnɪər/) acuity is the smallest visible offset between the stimuli that can be detected. Because the disalignments are often much smaller than the diameter and spacing of retinal receptors, vernier acuity requires neural processing and "pooling" to detect it. Vernier acuity develops rapidly during infancy and continues to slowly develop throughout childhood. At approximately three to twelve months old, it surpasses grating acuity in foveal vision in humans. However, vernier acuity decreases more quickly than grating acuity in peripheral vision. Ewald Hering first explained vernier acuity in 1899, based on data by Alfred Wilhelm Volkmann in 1863 and results by Ernst Anton Wülfing in 1892.

Vernier acuity is resistant to defocus, motion, and luminance, but is subject to practice effects and changes in attention. After training, observers' absolute threshold has been shown to improve by as much as 6 times.

== Testing ==
Vernier acuity is measured by asking participants to judge the offset between two parallel line segments with both eyes (binocular vision) or with each eye individually (monocular vision).

Vernier measures in infants and non-verbal children can be done using the preferential-looking technique or by electrophysiological techniques.

== See also ==
- Vernier scale
- Stereoscopic acuity
- Snellen chart
