= Hering's law of visual direction =

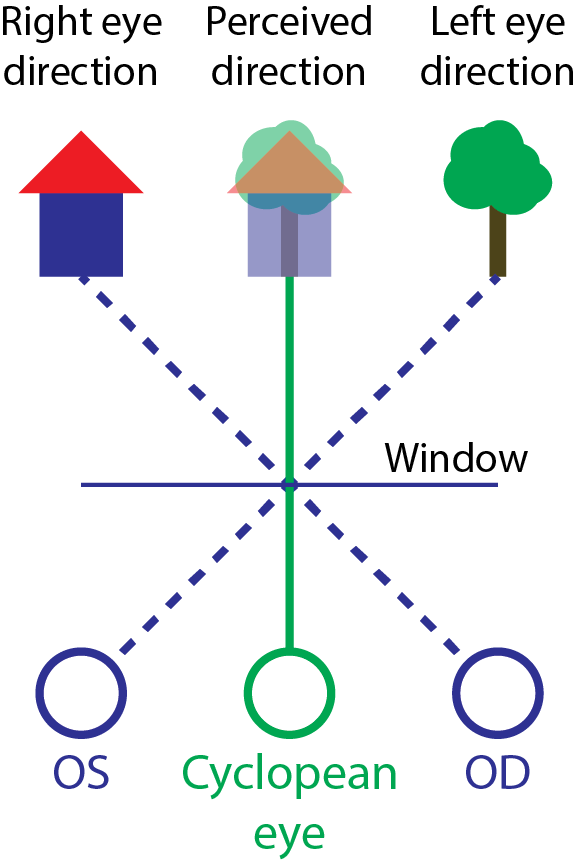
Hering's demonstration of his law of visual direction.

Hering's law of visual direction describes the perceived visual direction of a point relative to an observer, a perception which is influenced by the facial anatomy of human beings.

== Description ==
Because the eyes are horizontally apart in the head, by about 6cm, the visual scene is seen from slightly different point of view by each eye. Thus comes the question of where a point is perceived, relative to the observer, when seen with either eye alone or binocularly. In 1879 Ewald Hering stated the following law: "For any given two corresponding lines of direction, or visual lines, there is in visual space a single visual direction upon which appears everything which actually lies in the pair of visual lines". Prior to Hering, both Alhazen (1021) and Wells (1792) addressed a similar questions but proposed slightly incorrect laws.

== Simplification ==
Hering's law can be simplified as (1) points falling on the same visual line seem to come from the same location; (2) visual directions are relative to the a unique egocenter (also called cyclopean eye) and (3) the perceived direction of a cyclopean line is the line that intersects the point of fixation. In other words, when seen monocularly a point appears in the direction of that point relative to the eye, but as if seen from the egocenter.

== Demonstration ==
Hering proposed a simple demonstration of his law. When one fixates a point straight ahead on a window, one might see, through transparency, a different object in each eye aligned with the fixation point. For example in the right eye a house is seen behind the fixation point through the window. The house will appear to be located on the left. In the left eye a tree is seen behind the fixation through the window, appearing to be located on the right. When both eyes look at the fixation point, the house and the tree will appear superimposed in the cyclopean image, however the perceived location of these two superimposed images will be straight ahead. This demonstrates that the perceived location of a point is influenced by its location in both eyes and is relative to an imaginary cyclopean eye (or egocenter).

Hering's window demonstration of his law of visual direction. Both eyes fixate a point on the window. The right eye sees Captain Haddock's curses book behind the fixation, the left eye sees the French press behind the fixation point. With both eyes open and fixating the book and the French press appear superimposed and straight ahead.

== See also ==
- Hering's law of equal innervation
- Stereopsis
