= Organic memory =

Organic memory is a discredited biological theory, held in the late nineteenth century before the rediscovery of Mendelian genetics. The theory held the controversial notion that all organic matter contains memory.

== History ==
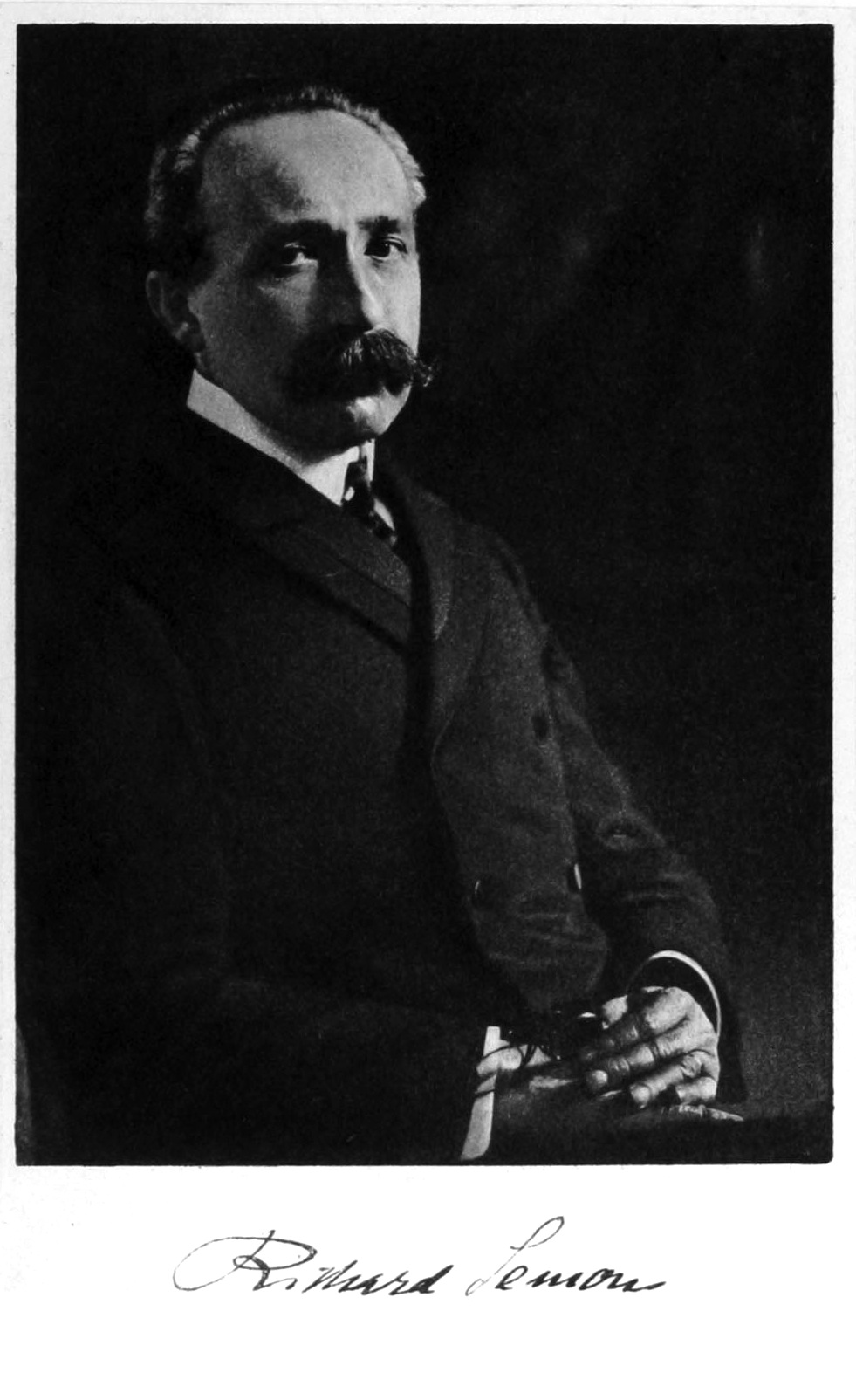
The German biologist Richard Semon linked organic memory to heredity.

German physiologist Ewald Hering first suggested the idea of organic memory in an 1870 lecture for the Imperial Academy of Science in Vienna. Hering took influence from the idea of inheritance of acquired characteristics and suggested that memories could be passed on through generations by germ cells.

Variants of the organic memory theory were proposed by advocates of Lamarckian evolution such as Samuel Butler, Ernst Haeckel, Eugenio Rignano, Théodule-Armand Ribot and Richard Semon. Proponents such as Semon connected the theory of organic memory to hereditary phenomena.

According to historian Petteri Pietikainen:

Semon argued not only that information is encoded into memory and that there are 'memory traces' (engrams) or after-effects of stimulation that conserve the changes in the nervous system, he also contended that these changes in the brain (that is, engrams) are inherited. Semon's mneme-theory fell into disrepute largely because in a Lamarckian fashion it proposed that memory units are passed from one generation to another.

Ideas of organic memory were popular amongst biologists and psychologists from 1870 to 1918. The theory later lost scientific legitimacy as it yielded no reliable data and advances in genetics made the theory untenable.
