= Pulmonary stretch receptor =

Pulmonary stretch receptors are mechanoreceptors found in the lungs.

When the lung expands, the receptors initiate the Hering-Breuer reflex, which reduces the respiratory rate. This signal is transmitted by vagus nerve. Increased firing from the stretch receptors also increases production of pulmonary surfactant. Intercostal muscles and thoracic diaphragm receive impulses from the respiratory center, stretch receptors in the lungs send impulses to the respiratory center giving information about the state of the lungs.

== See also ==
- Stretch receptor
