= Hering–Breuer reflex =

Biological reflex to prevent lung over-inflation

The Hering–Breuer inflation reflex, named for Josef Breuer and Ewald Hering, is a reflex triggered to prevent the over-inflation of the lung. Pulmonary stretch receptors present on the wall of bronchi and bronchioles of the airways respond to excessive stretching of the lung during large inspirations.

Once activated, they send action potentials through large myelinated fibers of the vagus nerve to the inspiratory area in the medulla and apneustic center of the pons. In response, the inspiratory area is inhibited directly and the apneustic center is inhibited from activating the inspiratory area. This inhibits inspiration, allowing expiration to occur.

The Hering–Breuer inflation reflex should not be confused with the deflation reflex discovered by the same individuals, Hering and Breuer. The majority of this page discusses the inflation reflex; the deflation reflex is considered separately at the end.

== History ==
Josef Breuer and Ewald Hering reported in 1868 that a maintained distention of the lungs of anesthetized animals decreased the frequency of the inspiratory effort or caused a transient apnea. The stimulus was therefore pulmonary inflation.

== Anatomy and physiology ==
The Hering-Breuer reflex, put simply, is what keeps the lungs from over-inflating with inspired air. The neural circuit that controls the Hering–Breuer inflation reflex involves several regions of the central nervous system, and both sensory and motor components of the vagus nerve.

Increased sensory activity of the pulmonary-stretch lung afferents (via the vagus nerve) results in inhibition of the central inspiratory drive and thus inhibition of inspiration and initiation of expiration. The lung afferents also send inhibitory projections to the cardiac vagal motor neurones (CVM) in the nucleus ambiguus (NA) and dorsal motor vagal nucleus (DMVN). The CVMs, which send motor fibers to the heart via the vagus nerve, are responsible for tonic inhibitory control of heart rate. Thus, an increase in pulmonary stretch receptor activity leads to inhibition of the CVMs and an elevation of heart rate (tachycardia). This is a normal occurrence in healthy individuals and is known as sinus arrhythmia.

== Rate and depth of breathing ==
Early physiologists believed the reflex plays a major role in establishing the rate and depth of breathing in humans. While this may be true for most animals, it is not the case for most adult humans at rest. However, the reflex may determine breathing rate and depth in newborns and in adult humans when tidal volume is more than 1 L, as when exercising.

== Hering–Breuer deflation reflex ==
The Hering–Breuer deflation reflex serves to shorten exhalation when the lung is deflated. It is initiated either by stimulation of stretch receptors or stimulation of proprioceptors activated by lung deflation. Like the inflation reflex, impulses from these receptors travel afferently via the vagus. Unlike the inflation reflex, the afferents terminate on inspiratory centers rather than the pontine apneustic center. These reflexes appear to play a more minor role in humans than in non-human mammals.

== Clinical use ==
The absence of this reflex contributes to the diagnosis of brain death.
