= Hering's law of equal innervation =

Idea that the eyes move in parallel because their muscles are equally innervated

Hering's law of equal innervation is used to explain the conjugacy of saccadic eye movement in stereoptic animals. The law proposes that conjugacy of saccades is due to innate connections in which the eye muscles responsible for each eye's movements are innervated equally. The law also states that apparent monocular eye movements are actually the summation of conjugate version and disjunctive (or vergence) eye movements. The law was put forward by Ewald Hering in the 19th century, though the underlying principles of the law date back considerably. Aristotle had commented upon this phenomenon and Ptolemy put forward a theory of why such a physiological law might be useful. The 11th century scholar Ibn al-Haytham stated that eyes move together and equally so that the visual axes converge on an object of interest in his Book of Optics.

Depiction of predictions for refoveating Müller's stimulus with eyes moving independently or eyes following Hering's law of equal innervation. Line of sight Visual direction Vergence

Hering's law of equal innervation is best understood with Johannes Peter Müller's stimulus where an observer refoveates a point that moved in one eye only. The least-effort way to refoveate is to move the misaligned eye only. Instead Hering's law predicts that because both eyes must move by equal amounts, a combination of conjunctive and disjunctive eye movements is required to refoveate the target point. Yarbus showed experimentally that binocular eyes movements are indeed composed mostly of combinations of saccades and vergence. However, it is now known that clear deviations from Hering's law also occur.

This theory is in contrast to the theory proposed by Hermann von Helmholtz which states that conjugacy is a learned, coordinated response and that the movements of the eyes are individually controlled. Helmholtz's point of view is today often caricatured as a chameleon-like, independent, control of the eyes although Helmholtz never defended that theory. Their disagreement concerned the innate vs. learned aspect of binocularly coordinated eye movements. Helmholtz's arguments were mainly related to Listing's law and can be simplified as the fact that there exist positions of the eyes where muscles will have different effects on the two eyes. Thus Hering's law, in its original formulation, simply cannot be correct as it would lead to situations where the eyes would move by different amounts, something on which both agreed never happens. Hering subsequently modified his law to state that the eyes behave as if they received equal innervation.

The extent to which Hering's law is correct, or not, remains in debate today, as the exact physiological underpinnings of vergence eye movements remain to be found.

== Sources ==
- Hering, Ewald (1977). Stark, Lawrence; Bridgeman, Bruce (eds.). The theory of binocular vision. Bridgeman, Bruce. New York: Plenum Press. ISBN 0-306-31016-3.
- Helmholtz, H. (1910). Treatise on Physiological Optics. New York: Dover. ISBN 1-85506-831-1.
- Yarbus, A. L. (1967). Eye Movements and Vision. New York: Plenum Press.
- Pickwell LD (September 1972). "Hering's law of equal innervation and the position of the binoculus". Vision Res. 12 (9): 1499–507. doi:10.1016/0042-6989(72)90175-7. PMID 5073145.
- Bahill AT, Ciuffreda KJ, Kenyon R, Stark L (December 1976). "Dynamic and static violations of Hering's law of equal innervation". Am J Optom Physiol Opt. 53 (12): 786–96. doi:10.1097/00006324-197612000-00005. PMID 1015527. S2CID 11881312.
- Enright J.T. (1984). "Changes in vergence mediated by saccades". J Physiol. 350: 9–31. doi:10.1113/jphysiol.1984.sp015186. PMC 1199254. PMID 6747862.

== See also ==
- Sherrington's law of reciprocal innervation
- Dissociated vertical deviation
- Orthoptics
