= Johannes Peter Müller =

German zoologist (1801–1858)

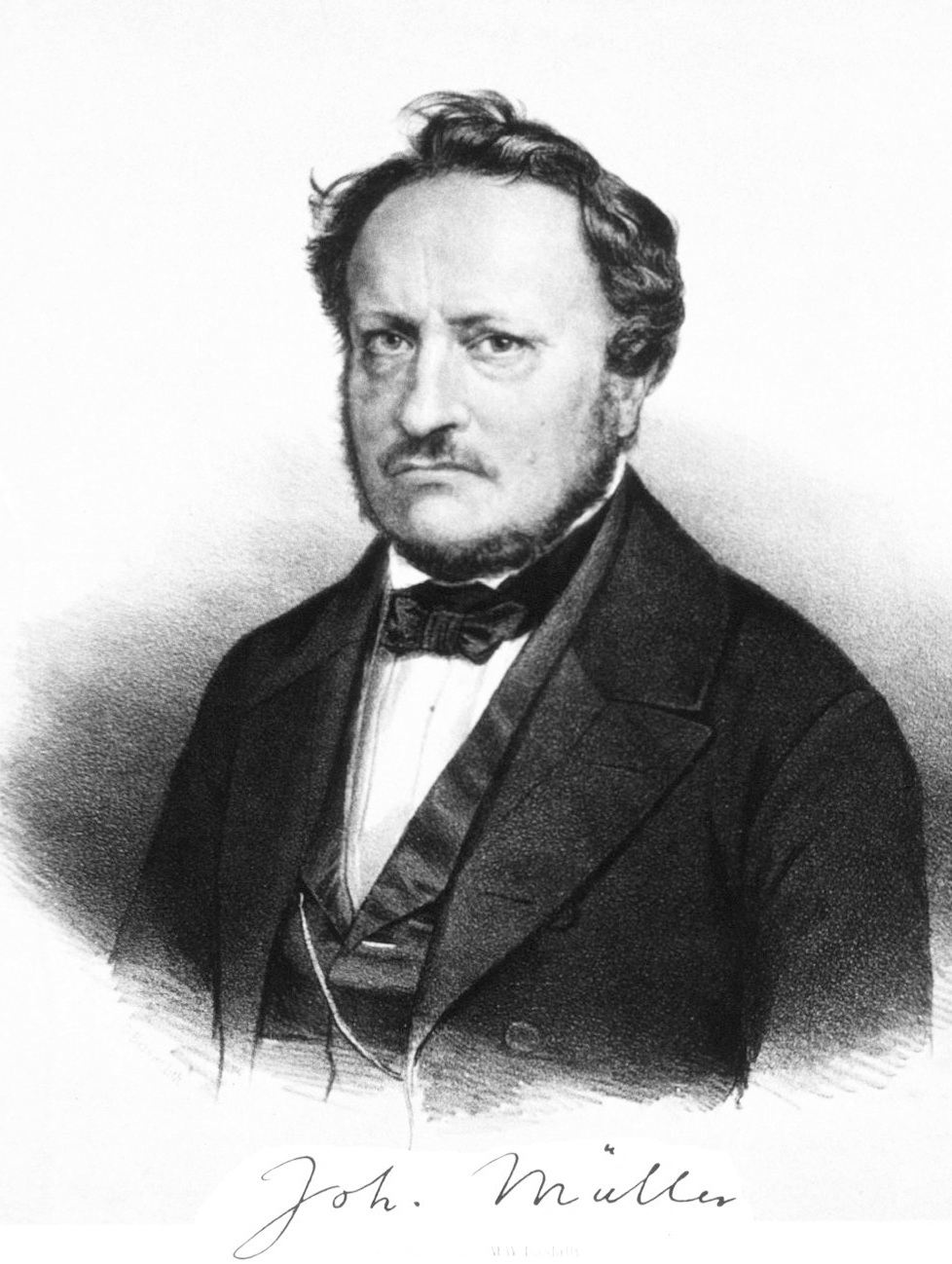
- Born: 14 July 1801; Koblenz, Rhin-et-Moselle, French First Republic
- Died: 28 April 1858 (aged 56); Berlin, Kingdom of Prussia, German Confederation
- Education: University of Bonn (PhD, 1822); University of Berlin (Dr. med. hab., 1824)
- Known for: Law of specific nerve energies Müller's frog experiment Müller's larva Müllerian ducts Vieth-Müller circle
- Awards: Pour le Mérite (1842)
- Scientific career
- Fields: Physiology
- Workplaces: University of Bonn; University of Berlin
- Thesis: Commentarii de phoronomia animalium (1822)
- Doctoral advisor: A. F. J. K. Mayer; Karl Rudolphi
- Other academic advisors: Philipp Franz von Walther
- Doctoral students: Hermann von Helmholtz; Rudolf Virchow
- Other notable students: Ferdinand Julius Cohn; Friedrich Anton Schneider; Wilhelm Wundt
- Author abbrev. (zoology): Müller

Johannes Peter Müller (14 July 1801 – 28 April 1858) was a German physiologist, comparative anatomist, ichthyologist, and herpetologist, known not only for his discoveries but also for his ability to synthesize knowledge. The paramesonephric duct (Müllerian duct) was named in his honor.

== Life ==
=== Early years and education ===
Müller was born in Coblenz. He was the son of a poor shoemaker, and was about to be apprenticed to a saddler when his talents attracted the attention of his teacher, and he prepared himself to become a Roman Catholic Priest. During his college course in Koblenz, he devoted himself to the classics and made his own translations of Aristotle. At first, his intention was to become a priest.

When he was eighteen, his love for natural science became dominant, and he turned to medicine, entering the University of Bonn in 1819. There he received his M.D. in 1822. He then studied at the University of Berlin. There, under the influence of G. W. F. Hegel and Karl Rudolphi, he was induced to reject all systems of physiology which were not founded upon a strict observation of nature. He habilited there in 1824.

=== Career summary ===
He became Privatdozent of physiology and comparative anatomy at the University of Bonn in 1824, extraordinary professor of physiology in 1826, and ordinary professor in 1830. In 1833 he went to the University of Berlin, where he filled the chair of anatomy and physiology until his death.

=== Early research ===
Müller made contributions in numerous domains of physiology, in particular increasing understanding of the voice, speech and hearing, as well as the chemical and physical properties of lymph, chyle and blood. His first important works, Zur vergleichenden Physiologie des Gesichtssinns (On the comparative physiology of sight, Leipzig, 1826) and Über die phantastischen Gesichtserscheinungen (On visual hallucination, Coblenz, 1826), are of a subjective philosophical tendency. The first work concerns the most important facts as to human and animal sight, the second sounds depths of difficult psychological problems. He soon became the leader in the science of the morphological treatment of zoology as well as of experimental physiology. To his research (1830) is due the settlement of the theory of reflex action.

=== Elements of Physiology ===
In the century preceding Müller's work, many contributions to physiological science had been made. Müller gave order to these facts, developed general principles and showed physiologists how recent discoveries in physics and chemistry could be applied to their work.

The appearance of his magnum opus, Handbuch der Physiologie des Menschen, between 1833 and 1840 (translated into English as Elements of Physiology by William Baly, and published in London 1837–1843) marked the beginning of a new period in the study of physiology. In it, for the first time, the results of human and comparative anatomy, as well as of chemistry and other departments of physical science, and tools like the microscope, were brought to bear on the investigation of physiological problems.

The most important portion of the work was that dealing with nervous action and the mechanism of the senses. Here he stated the principle, previously recognized but not stated as clearly, that the kind of sensation following stimulation of a sensory nerve does not depend on the mode of stimulation but upon the nature of the sense organ. Thus light, pressure, or mechanical stimulation acting on the retina and optic nerve invariably produces luminous impressions. This he termed the law of specific energies of the sense.

The book became the leading textbook in physiology for much of the nineteenth century. It manifests Müller's interests in vitalism, philosophy and scientific rigor. He discusses the difference between inorganic and organic matter. He considers in detail various physiological systems of a wide variety of animals, but attributes the indivisible whole of an organism to the presence of a soul. He also proposes that living organisms possess a life-energy for which physical laws can never fully account.

Edward Forbes F.R.S. in his A History of British Starfishes, and Other Animals of the Class Echinodermata (1841) in his preface refers to Muller as "one of the greatest living physiologists, Muller of Berlin".

=== Later years ===
In the later part of his life he chiefly devoted himself to comparative anatomy. Fishes and marine invertebrates were his favorite subjects. He took 19 trips to the Baltic and North Sea, the Adriatic and the Mediterranean to investigate salt-water life.

He authored a comprehensive work on the anatomy of amphibians, which in his era included reptiles. Also, he described several new species of snakes.

Müller coined the term desmoid, from the Greek desmos 'tendon-like', in 1838. The same year, he also described phyllodes tumors, which he called cystosarcoma phyllodes.

Müller mentored such distinguished scientists and physiologists as Hermann von Helmholtz, Emil du Bois-Reymond, Fritz Müller, Theodor Schwann, Friedrich Gustav Jakob Henle, Ernst Wilhelm Brücke, Carl Ludwig and Ernst Haeckel. In 1834, he was elected a foreign member of the Royal Swedish Academy of Sciences. In 1846, the American Philosophical Society elected him an international Member.

Müller died in Berlin in 1858. In 1899, a bronze statue by Joseph Uphues was erected in his memory in Koblenz.

== Works ==
In addition to his Handbuch der Physiologie (translated by W. M. Baly in 1843 as Elements of Physiology), his publications include:

- De Respiratione Fœtus (Leipzig, 1823), a prize dissertation
- Zur vergleichenden Physiologie des Gesichtssinns (1826)
- Über die phantastischen Gesichtserscheinungen (1826)
- Bildungsgeschichte der Genitalien (1830), in which he traced the development of the Müllerian duct
- De glandularum secernentium structura penitiori (1830)
- Beiträge zur Anatomie und Naturgeschichte der Amphibien (1832)
- Der Tabak in geschichtlicher, botanischer, chemischer und medizinischer Hinsicht (Berlin, 1832)
- Vergleichende Anatomie der Myxinoiden (1834–1843)
- Ueber die organischen Nerven der erectilen männlichen Geschlechtsorgane… (Berlin, 1835)
- Ueber den feineren Bau der krankhaften Geschwülste (On the structural details of malignant tumors, Coblenz, 1838), unfinished – a pioneering use of microscopical research in the investigation of pathological anatomy
- Systematische Beschreibung der Plagiostomen (1841) with F. G. J. Henle
- System der Asteriden. Braunschweig: Friedrich Vieweg und Sohn. (1842) with F. H. Troschel
- Horae ichthyologicae (1845–1849) with Troschel
- Über die fossilen Reste der Zeuglodonten… (1848)
- Über Synopta digitata und über die Erzeugung von Schnecken in Holothurien (1852)

After the death of J. F. Meckel (1781–1833) he edited the Archiv für Anatomie und Physiologie.

== See also ==
- Connective tissue
- Hering's law of equal innervation
- List of German inventors and discoverers

Taxa described by him

- Category:Taxa named by Johannes Peter Müller
