= Cover test =

Examination to determine eye misalignment

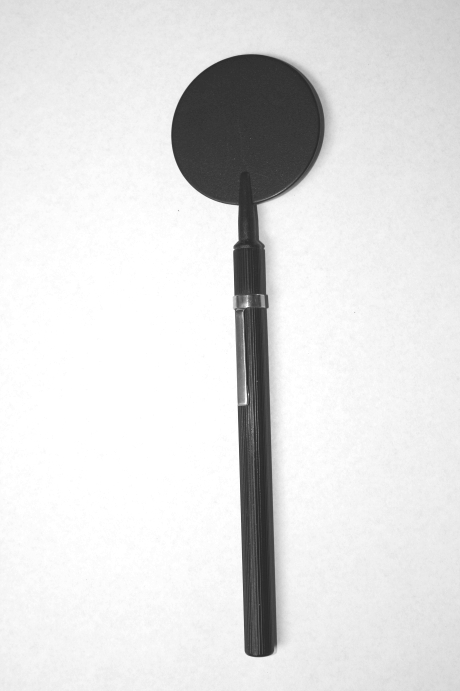
Eye cover instrument.

A cover test or cover-uncover test is an objective determination of the presence and amount of ocular deviation. It is typically performed by orthoptists, ophthalmologists and optometrists during eye examinations.

The two primary types of cover tests are:

- the alternating cover test
- the unilateral cover test (or the cover-uncover test).

The test involves having the patient focusing on both a distance as well as near object at different times during the examination. A cover is placed over an eye for a short moment then removed while observing both eyes for movement. The misaligned eye will deviate inwards or outwards. The process is repeated on both eyes and then with the patient focusing on a distant object. The cover test is used to determine both the type of ocular deviation and measure the amount of deviation. The two primary types of ocular deviations are the tropia and the phoria. A tropia is a misalignment of the two eyes when a patient is looking with both eyes uncovered. A phoria (or latent deviation) only appears when binocular viewing is broken and the two eyes are no longer looking at the same object.

The unilateral cover test is performed by having the patient focus on an object then covering the fixating eye and observing the movement of the other eye. If the eye was exotropic, covering the fixating eye will cause an inwards movement; and if esotropic, covering the fixating eye will cause an outwards movement. The alternating cover test, or cross cover test is used to detect total deviation (tropia + phoria).

== Medical use ==
The cover test is regarded as an essential examination in investigating strabismus. It is simple to undertake, does not require great amounts of skill by the examiner and is objective in nature. To ensure that the test is executed accurately and that the maximal amount of information is obtained, it is paramount that the appropriate fixation targets are used for near (approximately 33 cm (13 in)), distance (3 m (10 ft)) and far distance (>3 m (10 ft)) and also that a cover consisting of a black 'paddle' is used. A translucent occluder paddle may also be used. This enables the examiner to see the eye's position behind the occluder.

Many characteristics of a strabismus can be gained from performing the cover test.

=== Strabismus ===
- The type of deviation: whether it be eso, exo, hyper, hypo or cyclo tropia.
- The size of the deviation: slight, small, moderate or large
- Speed to take up fixation: if the eye takes up fixation fast it means there is good vision in that eye
- Accommodation on the deviation
- Nystagmus
- Dissociated vertical deviation (DVD)
- Incomitance – deviation angle varies in each position of gaze

=== Latent deviation ===
- Type of deviation: esophoria, exophoria, hyperphoria, hypophoria, cyclophoria
- Size of deviation
- Rate of recovery that enables the person to achieve binocular single vision. It also says a lot about the strength of control over the deviation.

== Fixation Targets ==
Fixation targets are required for both the near (33 cm) and far (6m) components of the cover test.

Near Targets (33 cm)

Light source – A penlight/light from retinoscope or ophthalmoscope could be used at the start of the near cover test assessment to observe the patient's corneal reflections, and to see whether their fixation is steady, central and maintained. Assessing the patient's fixation is especially important in those patients who have amblyopia.

Detailed target – Any small object that has the ability to stimulate Accommodation (eye) and allow the examiner to assess the patient's fixation. For children, very small pictures like those seen on a Lang stick can be used. Whereas for adults a small Snellen chart letter or number can be used.

Distance Targets (6m)

Spotlight – In those patients with amblyopia a spotlight could be used. (Same as near targets).

Snellen chart – This is the most commonly used target when assessing a patient's far component of a cover test.

Small landmark – Any fixed landmark at eye level, which can be seen through a window.

Stationary Toy – Fixed, talking toys are often used in children when their fixation is difficult to obtain when assessing the far component of the cover test.

Note: That when using any of the targets above (near or far), it is vital that they are placed as close to the patient's eye level as possible. This will eliminate any inaccurate results. Also during the cover test, the examiner must make sure that the patient is clearly seeing the fixation targets to confirm their Accommodation (eye) is controlled.

== Method ==
There are 2 parts to the Cover Test (CT), which include the cover and uncover component and the alternate cover test.

Prior to proceeding, ensure that there is sufficient light in the room so that the examiner can clearly see the patient's eyes. Sit approximately 30 cm away from the patient to ensure the examiner is able to observe the patient's eye movement. Explain the purpose of the test to the patient, for example: "I am going to check how well your eye muscles are working together."

The cover/uncover part includes 1 eye being covered. Instruction to the patient: "I would like you to look at this letter at near (examiner holds up the fixation target) or the clearest letter you can see at the other end of the room on the Snellen chart for distance testing. Keep watching the letter while I cover your eye."

The examiner observes:

- The movement of the uncovered eye taking up fixation
- The movement as well as position of the eye under the cover when the paddle is removed (repeat until the examiner can observe a movement/no movement to confirm a diagnosis)
- Cover/uncover method looks for heterotropia

The alternate CT has to ensure that one eye is dissociated at all times:

- The movement of the covered eye is recorded as the paddle is changed from one eye to the other every 3 seconds while allowing the eye to take up fixation
- Place the cover before the first eye in a manner that prevents the patient from viewing the target but allows the examiner to continue seeing the covered eye
- Observe the response of the first eye tested behind the occluder when it is first covered

Note: The cover/uncover component of the test is less dissociating than the alternate CT. The alternate CT cannot distinguish between manifest and latent deviations. When measuring in the distance ensure one is not blocking the patient's view of the fixation target.

== Practical Application ==
Stages in the detection of a manifest deviation

When a patient has a manifest strabismus the uncovered eye will take up fixation when the fixing eye is covered. The cover/ uncover test is performed at near using a flashlight as a target. Shining a light in the patient's eye allows the orthoptist to observe their corneal reflection. When the eyes are straight the corneal reflections will be located centrally in each pupil. When the patient has a deviation one corneal reflection will be in the centre of the pupil and the other reflection will be on or close to the iris. When detecting a manifest deviation the Orthoptist covers the straight eye if a deviation is apparent or the eye with the better VA. Observe the behaviour of the uncovered eye.

This procedure is now repeated with an accommodative target. Ask the patient to look at a fixation stick that has a picture or a letter and observe the deviation at near and distance.

An alternate cover test is performed to ensure full dissociation, observe any changes in the amount and type of movement.

Lastly, repeat the cover/uncover test and note whether the eye remains deviated or returns to its original position.

Stages in the detection of a latent deviation

When searching for a latent deviation our attention is directed to the covered eye. When performing the cover/uncover test the uncovered eye does not move; however the eye that is under the cover will deviate and return to a straight position when the cover is removed.

The uncover/cover test is also performed at near and distance with an accommodative target. Once a cover/uncover test has been performed to confirm the presence of a manifest deviation our attention is turned to the behavior of the covered eye. It is important that when observing the covered eye look at the speed and recovery of the eye when the cover is removed.

An alternate cover test is also performed and this provides information about the maximum deviation. The speed that the eye recovers indicates the patient's control over the deviation. The faster the recovery the better control the patient has over the deviation.

Finally, a cover/uncover test must be performed again to ensure the deviation has remained latent and recovery is the same.

== Precautions ==
Cautions to be noted in avoidance of misdiagnoses /contamination of results

It is important to avoid prolonged periods of dissociation of the eyes until a diagnosis can be made regarding the strabismus. Hence, the importance to note that although the eyes require dissociation for a minimum of three seconds, that dissociation is kept minimal whilst fixation is maintained. The cover test should be considered prior to testing VA patients with strabismus, for occlusion during testing may dissociate an unstable ocular deviation. In the case of intermittent or latent deviations, for dissociative complications leading to misdiagnosis, it is also advised that binocular vision is tested prior, along with stereo testing.

Frequently, during testing, the cover can be removed prematurely; therefore, as mentioned earlier, dissociation of at least three seconds is needed for the patient to take up fixation during cover testing. This time allows for patients to recover from dissociation post cover removal.

A penlight should be used to observe the steadiness and positioning of the deviated eye.

Ensure to assist the patient in maintaining fixation on accommodative or distance targets at all times - if testing on children or adults, request specific details pertaining to the accommodative target (to assure accommodation is utilized) for near testing. Use of a detailed target for near fixation in both adults and children will identify the effects of accommodation on the deviation. Observing pupillary constriction should also be indicative of accommodation. Cover-Uncover testing and alternate cover testing should be performed on the deviating eye even when a constant heterotropia is observed. This practice ensures the detection of a consistent increase in deviation and DVD is not neglected.

The presence of orthophoria in uncommon when assessing both near and far fixation. VA must be considered when there is no deviation seen upon cover testing given amblyopic eyes may not take up fixation (VA too poor to see target or eccentric fixation). Microtropia may be present when a small unequal VA is recorded.

== Recording ==
The cover test results must be recorded in a clear and brief manner. The information included should include the following:

- Type of deviation present: manifest or latent deviation
- Direction of the deviation: horizontal, vertical or a combination of both
- Estimation of size: the examiner will observe the position of the corneal reflections and the amount of movement shown to take up fixation
- In latent deviations the speed of recovery is noted: it can be described as rapid, moderate, delayed or blink (the blink regains fusion). If diplopia is noted before recovery this should also be recorded
- The distance the test was performed - whether it was at near (1/3m) or distance (6m)
- Whether the test was performed with/without glasses
- Whether the test was performed with/without a compensatory head posture
- In a poorly controlled phoria recovery may not occur and the deviation will be manifest - make a note of this also

Examples of a cover test recording:

CT: cc sml LXT/XT' nhf
CT: sc mod E/E' c r.r
CT: cc RET holds fixation

RE(T)' holds fixation

== See also ==
- Hirschberg test
- Lancaster red-green test
- Strabismus
