= List of optometric abbreviations =

Certain abbreviations are current within the profession of optometry. They are used to denote clinical conditions, examination techniques and findings, and various forms of treatment.

== Eye examination terms ==
Abbreviation	Term	Description (notes)
AC	Anterior chamber	fluid-filled space between the iris and the endothelium
AC 4/4	Grade 4 anterior chamber angle	open angle between cornea and iris
AC 3/4	Grade 3 anterior chamber angle	
AC 2/4	Grade 2 anterior chamber angle	
AC 1/4	Grade 1 anterior chamber angle	
AC 0/4	Grade 0 anterior chamber angle	closed angle between cornea and iris
AC/A	Accommodative convergence / Accommodation ratio	the portion of the range of convergence that occurs in response to accommodation
Acc	Accommodation	process of changing optical power to maintain focus as distance changes
Ad	Advised	
Add	Addition	
AIT	After-image transfer	
ALT	Alternating	
ALT ET/SOT	Alternating esotropia	
ALT XT/XOT	Alternating exotropia	
ARC	Anomalous retinal correspondence	
A/V	Arteriole–venue ratio	
BIO	Binocular indirect ophthalmoscopy	
BSV	Binocular single vision	
BV	Binocular vision	
BVD	Back vertex distance	
BVP	Back vertex power	
CD	Centration distance	
C/D	Cup–disc ratio	
CF	Count fingers vision – state distance	
c/o or c.o.	Complains of	
CT	Cover test	
c/u	Check up	
CW	Close work	
Δ	Prism dioptre	
D	Dioptres	
DC	Dioptres cylinder	
DNA	Did not attend	
DOB	Date of birth	
DS	Dioptres sphere	
DV	Distance vision	
DVD	Dissociated vertical deviation	
EF	Eccentric fixation	
FB	Foreign body	
FD	Fixation disparity	
FF	Foveal fixation	
FHG	Family history of glaucoma	
FMH	Family medical history	
FOH	Family ocular history	
F/U	Follow up appointment	
GH	General health	
G(M)P	General (medical) practitioner	
HA	Headaches	
HARC	Harmonious abnormal retinal correspondence	
HM	Hand motion vision – state distance	
Hx	History	
IOL	Intra-ocular lens	
IOP	Intra-ocular pressure	
ISNT	Inferior, Superior, Nasal, Temporal	rule used to assess optic disc appearance
K	Keratometry	
OS	oculus sinister (left eye)	
LHyperT or LHT	Left hypertropia	
LHypoT	Left hypotropia	
LO	Lenticular opacity	
L/R FD	L/R fixation disparity	
L/R	L hyperphoria	
Left ET	Left esotropia	
LVA	Low vision aid	
MDU	Mallett distance unit	
MNU	Mallett near unit	
M.Wing	Maddox Wing	
MR	Maddox rod	
NB: NAD	No abnormality detected	(is frequently used but is not recommended)
NCT	Non-contact tonometer	
ND	Neutral density filter	
NLP	No light perception	No light perception is considered total visual impairment, or total blindness; see Visual impairment#Classification
NPC	Near point of convergence or no previous correction	
NRC	Normal retinal correspondence	
NV	Near vision	
NWT	Normal wearing time	
o symptoms	Zero symptoms	
Φ	Horizontal orthophoria	
θ	Vertical orthophoria	
⊕	Horizontal and vertical orthophoria	
OC's	Optical centres	
Occ.	Occupation	
OD	oculus dexter (right eye)	
OH	Ocular history	
OMB	Oculo motor balance	
ONH	Optic nerve head	
Oph	Ophthalmoscopy	
OS	oculus sinister (left eye)	
OU	oculus uterque (both eyes)	
PD	Pupillary distance	
PERRLA	Pupils equal, round, reactive to light and accommodation	
PH	Pinhole	see Pinhole occluder and Visual_acuity#Legal_definitions
PHNI	Pinhole No Improvement	see Pinhole occluder and Visual_acuity#Legal_definitions
PHVA	Pinhole Visual Acuity	
PL	Perception of light	
POH / PrOH	Previous ocular history	
PPA	Peri-papillary atrophy	
Pt	Patient	
RAPD	Relative afferent pupillary defect	
OD	Right eye (oculus dexter)	
Ret.	Retinoscopy	
RHyperT	Right hypertropia	
RHypoT or RHT	Right hypotropia	
RNFL	Retinal nerve fibre layer	
RPE	Retinal pigment epithelium	
RSOT	Right esotropia	
Rx	Prescription	
SE	Spherical Equivalent	
SLE	Slit lamp examination	
SLM	Slit lamp microscope	
EP	Esophoria	
ET	Esotropia	
Supp.	Suppression	
V	Vision (unaided)	
VA	Visual acuity	
VA Dcc - VA Dsc	Visual acuity with Distant chart with correctors	Visual acuity with eye chart at Distant 20 feet (6 m) and with (cc: Latin cum correctore) correctors (spectacles); Dsc is without (sc: Latin sine correctore) correctors. See Visual_acuity#Legal_definitions
VA Nsc - VA Ncc	Visual acuity with Near chart without correctors	Visual acuity with eye chart at Near 15.7 inches (400 mm) and without (sc: Latin sine correctore) correctors (spectacles); Ncc is with (cc: Latin cum correctore) correctors. See Visual_acuity#Legal_definitions
VA OS	Left visual acuity	
VA OD	Right visual acuity	
VDU	Visual display unit	
VF	Visual field	
VPS	Variable prism stereoscope	
WD	Working distance	
X/12	X months	
X/52	X weeks	
X/7	X days	
XP	Exophoria	
XT	Exotropia	

== Clinical conditions terms ==
Abbreviation	Term	Description (notes)
AH	Asteroid hyalosis	
AMD/ARMD	Age-related macular degeneration	
ACG/CAG	Angle closure glaucoma	
BDR	Background diabetic retinopathy	
BP	Blood pressure	
BRAO	Branch retinal artery occlusion	
BRVO	Branch retinal vein occlusion	
Cat	Cataract	
CLAPC/CLIPC	Contact lens associated/induced papillary conjunctivitis	
CLARE	Contact lens associated red eye	
CLPU	Contact lens associated peripheral ulcer	
CNS	Central nervous system	
CNV	Choroidal neovascularization	
CRAO	Central retinal artery occlusion	
CRVO	Central retinal vein occlusion	
CSR	Central serous retinopathy	
CVA	Cerebrovascular accident	
Dx	Diagnosis	
dDx	Differential diagnosis	
DR	Diabetic retinopathy	
ERM	Epiretinal membrane	
ESR	Erythrocyte sedimentation rate	
FTMH	Full thickness macular hole	
FMNS	Fusion maldevelopment nystagmus syndrome	(Latent nystagmus)
Fx	Family history	
GPC	Giant papillary conjunctivitis	
Hx	Hospital or History	
HES	Hospital eye service	
IDDM	Insulin dependent diabetes mellitus	
ILM	Internal limiting membrane	
IRMA	Intra-retinal microvascular abnormality	
KCS	Keratoconjunctivitis sicca	
KP	Keratic precipitates	
LASEK	Laser epithelial keratomileusis	
LASIK	Laser in-situ keratomileusis	
LTG	Low-tension glaucoma	
MH	Macular hole	
MI	Myocardial infarction	
MS	Multiple sclerosis	
NIDDM	Non-insulin-dependent diabetes mellitus	
NRR	Neuro-retinal rim	
NS	Nuclear sclerosis	
NTG	Normal tension glaucoma	
PDR	Proliferative diabetic retinopathy	
PDT	Photodynamic therapy	
PK	Penetrating keratoplasy	
POAG	Primary open-angle glaucoma	
PPDR	Preproliferative diabetic retinopathy	
PRA	Pan-retinal ablation	
PRK	Photorefractive keratectomy	
PRP	Pan-retinal photocoagulation	
PSCC	Posterior sub-capsular cataract	
PVD	Posterior vitreous detachment	
PXF	Pseudoexfoliative syndrome	
RD	Retinal detachment	
RK	Radial keratotomy	
RP	Retinitis pigmentosa	
SEAL	Superior epithelial arcuate lesion	
SLK	Superior limbic keratoconjunctivitis	
SMH	Submacular hemorrhage	
SPK	Superficial punctate keratitis	
SPEE	Superficial punctate epithelial erosions	
Sx	Symptoms	
TIA	Transient ischaemic attack	
T1 diab	Type 1 diabetes	
T2 diab	Type 2 diabetes	
Tx	Treatment	
Vx	Vomiting	

== Refraction terms ==
Abbreviation	Term	Description
M	Myopia	
H	Hyperopia/Hypermetropia	
A	Astigmatism	
P	Presbyopia	
SMA	Simple Myopic Astigmatism	
CMA	Compound Myopic Astigmatism	
SHA	Simple Hyperopic Astigmatism	
CHA	Compound Hyperopic Astigmatism	

== Contact lens terms ==
Abbreviation	Term	Description (notes)
BC	Base curve	
BOZD	Back optic zone diameter	
BOZR	Back optic zone radius	
BVP	Back vertex power	
CLAPC/CLIPC	Contact-lens-associated/induced papillary conjunctivitis	
CLARE	Contact-lens-associated red eye	
CLPU	Contact-lens-associated peripheral ulcer	
Dk	Unit of permeability	
DW	Daily wear	
EW	Extended wear	
FOZD	Front optic zone diameter	
FVP	Front vertex power	
HEMA	Hydroxyethyl methacrylate	
HT	Handling tint	
HVID	Horizontal visible iris diameter	
K	Keratometry	
MWT	Maximum wearing time	
OS/OD	Overall size/overall diameter	
OZD	Optic zone diameter	
PMMA	Polymethyl methacrylate	
RGP	Rigid-gas-permeable	
SCL	Soft contact lens	
SiH	Silicone hydrogel	
SEAL	Superior epithelial arcuate lesion	
SLK	Superior limbic keratoconjunctivitis	
SPK	Superficial punctate keratitis	
SPEE	Superficial punctate epithelial erosions	
TBUT	Tear break-up time	
Tc	Centre thickness	
TD	Total diameter	
Te	Edge thickness	
TWT/WTT	Today wearing time	
VPA	Vertical palpebral aperture	
WT	Wearing time	

== Pharmacy and drug terms ==
Abbreviation	Term	Description (notes)
A.d.	As directed	
bd/bid	Twice a day	
gt	One drop	
gtt	drops	
GSL	General sales list	
Gutt/g	Guttae (drops)	
Meds	Medications	
Nocte/QHS	At night	
Occ	Ointment	
od/QD	Once a day	
otc	Over the counter (bought medication)	
P	Pharmacy (drug)	
POM	Prescription-only medicine	
prn	When required	
q	Every (e.g. q2h – every two hours)	
qds/qid	Four times a day	
Rx	Prescription	
tds/tid	Three times a day	
ung	Ointment	

== Examination types and enhanced care schemes ==
Abbreviation	Term	Description (notes)
DFE	Dilated fundus examination	
DFP	Digital fundus photograph(y)	
DRS	Diabetic retinopathy screening	
GIES	Glasgow Integrated Eyecare Scheme	
PEARS	Primary Eyecare Acute Referral Scheme	
WEHE	Welsh Eye Health Examination	
WLVS	Welsh Low Vision Service	
