= Prism fusion range =

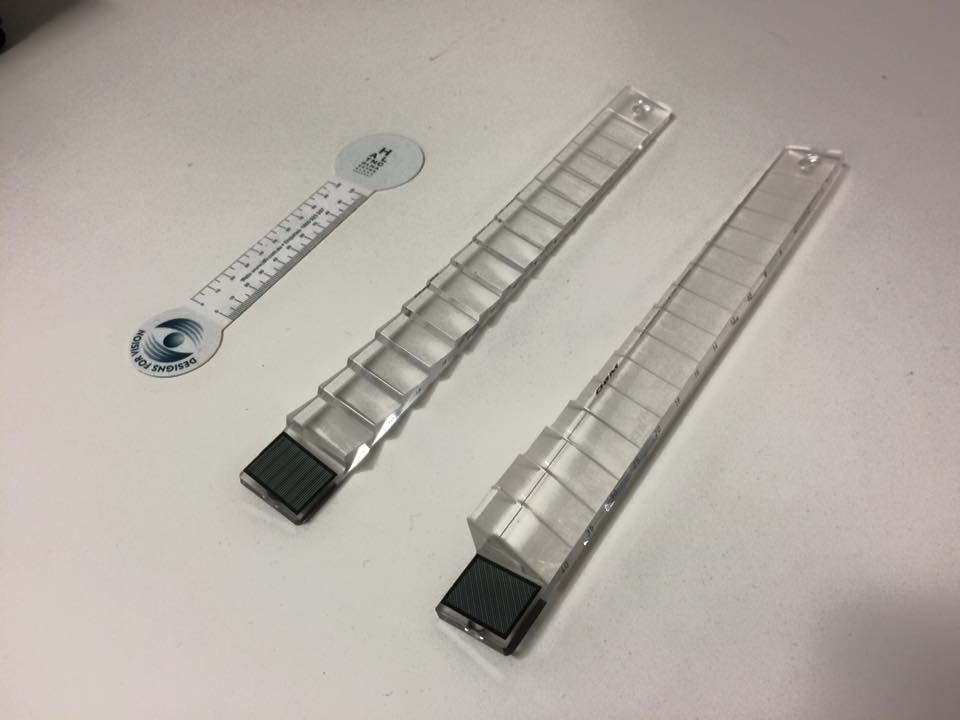
Equipment required to perform a Prism Fusion Range Test. From left to right: an accommodative fixation stick, a vertical prism bar, and a horizontal prism bar.

The prism fusion range (PFR) or fusional vergence amplitude is a clinical eye test performed by orthoptists, optometrists, and ophthalmologists to assess motor fusion, specifically the extent to which a patient can maintain binocular single vision (BSV) in the presence of increasing vergence demands. Motor fusion is largely accounted to amplitudes of fusional vergences and relative fusional vergences. Fusional vergence is the maximum vergence movement enabling BSV and the limit is at the point of diplopia (double vision). Relative fusional vergence is the maximum vergence movement enabling a patient to see a comfortable clear image and the limit is represented by the first point of blur. These motor fusion functions should fall within average values so that BSV can be comfortably achieved. Excessive stress on the vergence system or inability to converge or diverge adequately can lead to asthenopic symptoms, which generally result from decompensation of latent deviations (heterophoria) or loss of control of ocular misalignments. Motor anomalies can be managed in various ways, however, in order to commence treatment, motor fusion testing such as the PFR is required. The PFR involves placing a prism bar in front of an eye. In a patient with BSV, a natural shift of the eye occurs. When measuring horizontal fusion ranges, base in prisms assess fusional divergence while base out prisms assess fusional convergence. The vertical fusional vergence amplitude can also be measured with base up and base down prisms although the horizontal PFR is typically the main focus when testing. When performing the PFR, prism strengths are increased, placing greater demand on the vergence system, eventually resulting in a break point accompanying diplopia. Break point, recovery and blur are key aspects of this assessment. The break point occurs at the loss of BSV, recovery point when BSV is regained from break and blur point is at the loss of comfortable BSV. These stops can be subjectively indicated when the patient notices a double or blurred image. Both subjective and objective measurements can be considered however the examiner's objective observation is the gold standard.

== Indications of use ==
This test is designed to assess the following:

- the limits of a patient's BSV
- strength of binocular functions (control) of a heterophoria to determine if it is decompensating
- fusional convergence with a base out prism
- fusional divergence with a base in prism
- vertical amplitude with base up and base down prisms
- positive and negative relative fusional convergence by asking patient to report when blur is appreciated
- progress of a patient undergoing management for ocular misalignments

== Methods of assessment ==
The PFR is performed in bright lighting conditions at near (33 cm) or far (6m), using prism bars (horizontal and vertical) and an accommodative fixation target such as a letter on a fixation stick for near, or a Snellen Chart letter for distance. The patient should wear their refractive correction for the distance being tested.

The following method relates to assessment of the horizontal PFR.

1. The patient, able to appreciate BSV, is asked to fixate on the accommodative target for the entirety of the assessment and to indicate when the target first becomes doubled.
2. The examiner places the prism bar in front of one of the patient's eyes with the prism placed "base in" to assess the fusional divergence amplitude. The divergence amplitude should be measured before convergence, as measuring the convergence amplitude first could contaminate the results of the divergence amplitude since convergence movements induce significant vergence adaptation.
3. Starting with the prism of the smallest power, the examiner increases the prismatic power slowly, allowing a fusion response for each prism, until the patient can no longer fuse and reports diplopia. The prism power value at which diplopia was appreciated is recorded as the break point. From the break point, the examiner slowly reduces the prismatic power until the patient regains BSV. The prism value at which the patient's BSV is first restored is recorded as the recovery point.
4. The above steps are repeated for the same eye, but with the prism bar placed with its base out to assess fusional convergence.

The results from this method of assessment rely on the patient's responses, and are therefore subjective. The assessment should also be performed objectively, in which the examiner observes the eye's movement behind the prism, anticipating the break point at which the eye can no longer make a vergence movement to maintain BSV.

== Recording and interpreting outcomes ==
When recording the results obtained from the PFR, it is important to include the following in order:

- name of the test performed; i.e."PFR"
- with optical correction "cc" or without correction "sc"
- distance the test was performed at i.e. far "(6m)" or near "(1/3m)"
- prism power at which the patient 'breaks' and 'recovers' i.e. the prism power number followed by its measuring unit symbol "Δ"
  - Note: Some examiners may choose not to assess and/or record 'recovery'. If recovery is being recorded, separate the 'break' and accompanying 'recovery' results with a forward slash i.e. "/".
- relevant position of the prism in front of the eye denoted by: base in "BI" or "-" for fusional divergence; base out "BO" or "+" for fusional convergence; base up "BU" or base down "BD" for vertical fusional vergence.
- what the patient sees when they 'break'; i.e. "c diplopia" or "c suppression"

There are two ways to record the PFR results, the first being the fusion range (break without recovery) and the other including break and recovery. Follow the examples below for guidance:

Fusion range:

- PFR cc (6m) 8Δ BI → 20Δ BO
- PFR sc (1/3m) 16Δ BI → 45Δ BO c diplopia

Break + recovery:

- PFR sc (6m) -8/6Δ → +20/15Δ c diplopia
- PFR cc (1/3m) -16/14Δ → +45/40Δ c diplopia

Patient results should be compared to the normal values for prism fusional amplitudes to determine if the patient has any anomalies. Recovery should ideally be within 5Δ of break point.

- Near (1/3m): 15Δ BI → 35-40Δ BO
- Distance (6m): 5-7Δ BI → 15Δ BO
- Vertical: 3Δ BU → 3Δ BD

If patient results do not reflect the normal values, they may have the following issues:

- Convergence insufficiency - usually associated with accommodative difficulties, the fusional convergence range of these patients is reduced.
- Divergence insufficiency- although rare and usually associated with a neurological condition, the PFR is able to detect a reduced divergence range.
- Divergence excess - when divergence occurs in excess, therefore the eyes demonstrate a reduced ability to converge. Usually occurs with an exo-deviation.

== Advantages and disadvantages ==
=== Advantages ===
- measures binocular functions and control of deviation simultaneously.
- Minimal equipment required.
- measures horizontal and vertical fusion ranges.
- Can provide subjective and objective measurements.
- Can be performed on patients with abnormal retinal correspondence.
- Determines the orthoptic exercises required to manage fusional inadequacies i.e. convergence insufficiency.

=== Disadvantages ===
- Can not measure cyclotorsion.
- Can not be performed on patients with suppression as patients can not appreciate diplopia.
- Convergence must be measured second to divergence or results will be contaminated.
- Can only be performed on patients with BSV to start with.
- Objective measurements rely on examiner expertise and may be difficult for beginners to observe.
- Subjective measurements require patient cooperation to attain reliable results.

== See also ==
- Strabismus
- Diplopia
- Suppression
- Binocular Vision
- 4 PRT
- 20 PRT
- Vergence
- Accommodation
