= Peripheral head-mounted display =

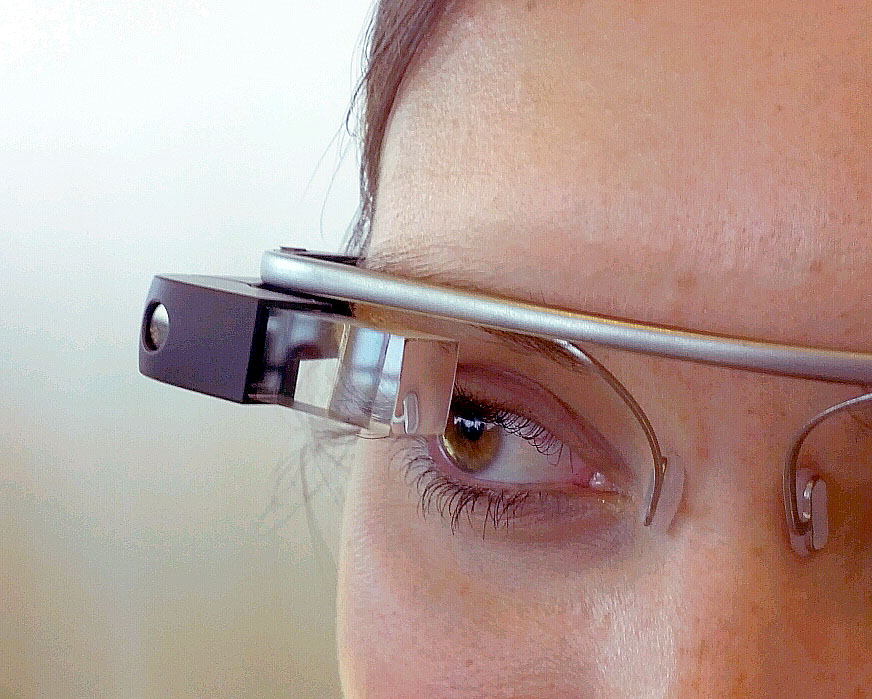
A Glass prototype seen at Google I/O in June 2012

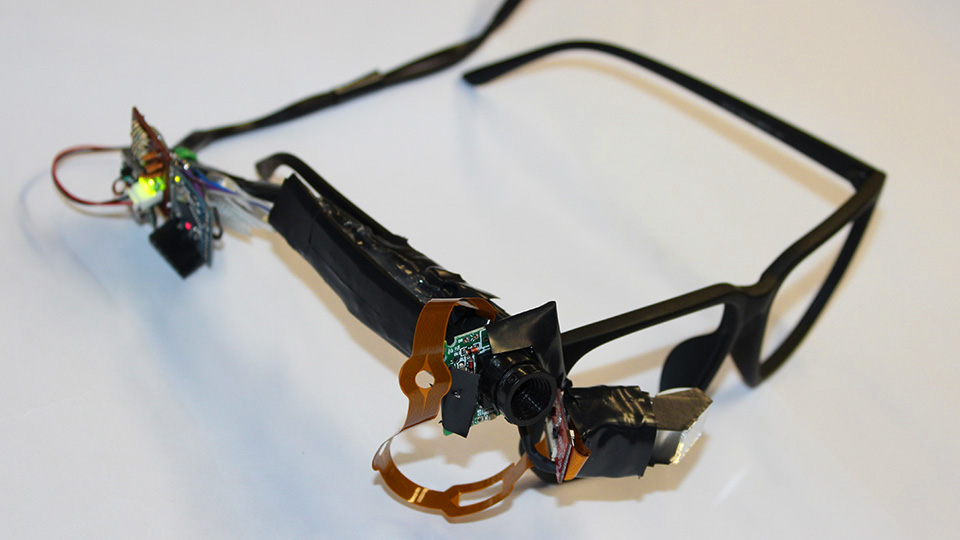
Do-It-Yourself Peripheral Head-Mounted Display: Besides the Optical Display this prototype also incorporates a Camera, Capacitive Touch Sensitive Field, Microcontroller.

A peripheral head-mounted display (PHMD) is a visual display (monocular or binocular) mounted to the user's head that is in the peripheral of the user's field of view (FOV) / peripheral vision. Whereby the actual position of the mounting (as the display technology) is considered to be irrelevant as long as it does not cover the entire FOV. While a PHMD provide an additional, always-available visual output channel, it does not limit the user performing real world tasks.

The term PHMD includes devices such as Google Glass, which are often misclassified as a Head-up display (HUD) if following the original definition by NASA. While NASA defined this term over centuries of space flight research, it actually describes a display that addresses the eyes-free problem, by absolving the user from the need to angle down their head. Furthermore, it provides augmented information in the user's forward field of view (FOV), which is commonly projected on a windshield. In contrast, the Head-Down Display (HDD) is located at the instrument control panel. Also, a HUD is mainly used to augment additional information into reality, which is technically not feasible yet for products such as Google Glass (lens focus on the display causes a blurred environment – see figure below).

This taxonomy for head-mounted displays is based on the property of its functionality and the ability of the human eye to perceive peripheral information, instead of being technology-dependent. In this article Human Factors for visual perception are being summarized, which are important to be taken into consideration when designing visual interfaces for PHMDs.

== Characteristics ==
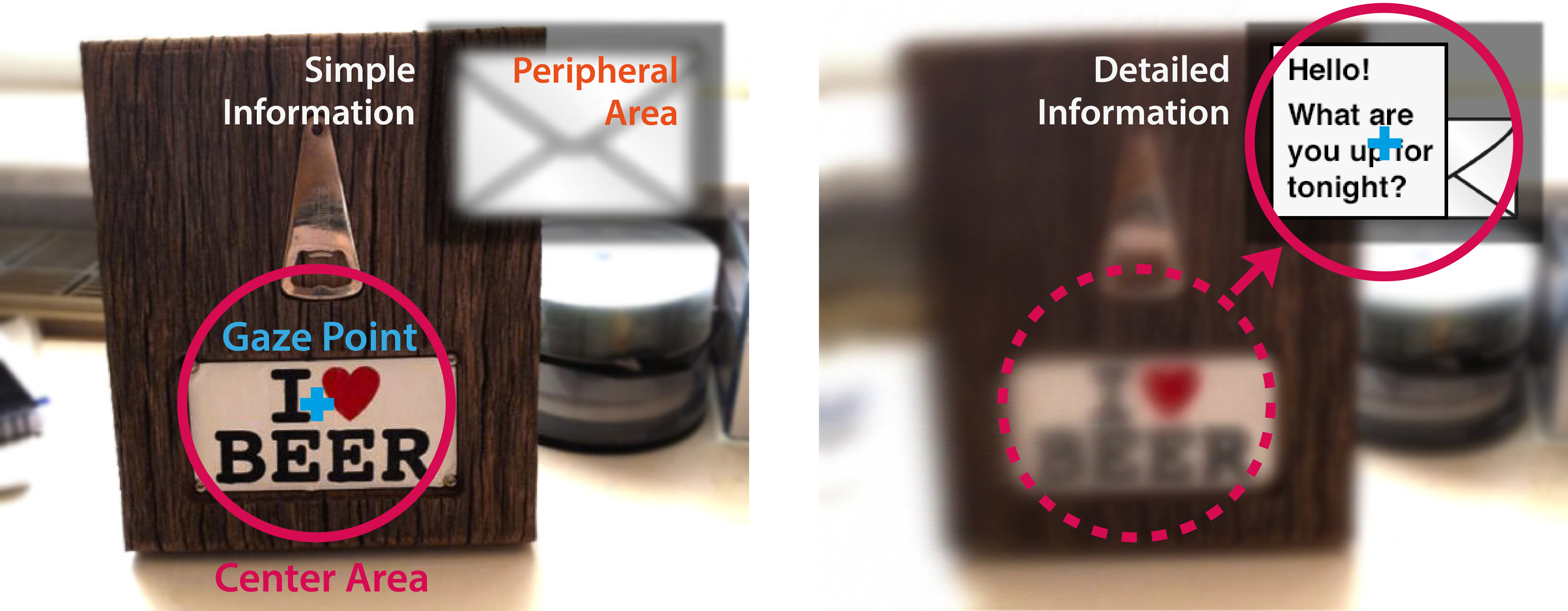
The two pictures illustrate the difference between detailed and peripheral information.

The most important uniqueness is that the user's FOV is not being fully covered, allowing the user to perform real world tasks without limitations, while not having the pretension to raise or create immersion, such as HMDs often aim for. For current display technologies, while projecting image onto the eye, the screen needs to be focused by the pupil to enable a clear reading of the screen, thus the environment becomes blurred and out-of-focus. So a PHMD such as Google Glass is capable of displaying detailed information, when the pupil is focusing the display itself, as it also allows for peripheral information when the eye focuses on the real world. Still, simple information such as notifications are perceivable when focusing on the real world instead of the display.

== Physiological Factors: Visual Perception ==
Research shows that designing an optimal visual output for Head-Mounted Displays is a complex issue, since there are several physiological factors that significantly impact users’ perception. The following effects are known in research:

=== Depth of Focus / Field ===
Switches permanently by refocusing on objects, which are different in distances to the user. A display mounted somehow to user's eye has fixed focal distance. Focusing information such as presented on a screen leads to a change in the depth of focus. This causes blurring of information presented at other layers, which especially degrades the perception of high spatial frequency information such as text.

=== Eye-Movements ===
Are actually done at a specific angle of 10°. To focus an object out of this angle, head movements are used automatically for support. However, when wearing an HMD with eye-movements that exceed this angle, since head movements do not have any effect on the interface, a drop in comfort might occur due to tired eye muscle.

=== Field-Of-View ===
Describes the FOV. The User's eye has a viewing angle of 94° from the center and 62° on the nose side. The vertical angle is about 60° upwards and 75° downwards. HMDs often do not cover the whole FOV, which is also a reason for increased cybersickness.

=== Binocular Rivalry ===
Describes the phenomenon, which occurs when dissimilar images are presented to the human eye. As the two images captured by each eye are incompatible for stereo processing, they fight for visual dominance over the other eye's side view, resulting in alternating views from the two eyes, where the non-dominant view is almost unseen. This effect often occurs when wearing a monocular HMD. In this setup, researchers also observed objects that completely vanish for several seconds from user's attention.

=== Visual Interference ===
Describes the phenomenon when both eyes perceive different images that are overlapping, but the brain is not able to distinguish between those. This phenomenon is also known as the inability for visual separation.

=== Phoria ===
Describes a muscle state of the eye, when the eyes are not focusing on a specific point. There are three different states, which can be distinguished: Esophoria, Exophoria, Orthophoria. While one eye is closed or being obstructed by a display, phoria can occur, which has the potential to cause Vertigo and Nausea as well.

=== Eye-Dominance ===
Although the user has two eyes, one eye is predominantly used. The other eye is used to make corrections and provide additional spatial information. It is recommended to wear a monocular HMD over the dominant eye.

== Peripheral Perception ==
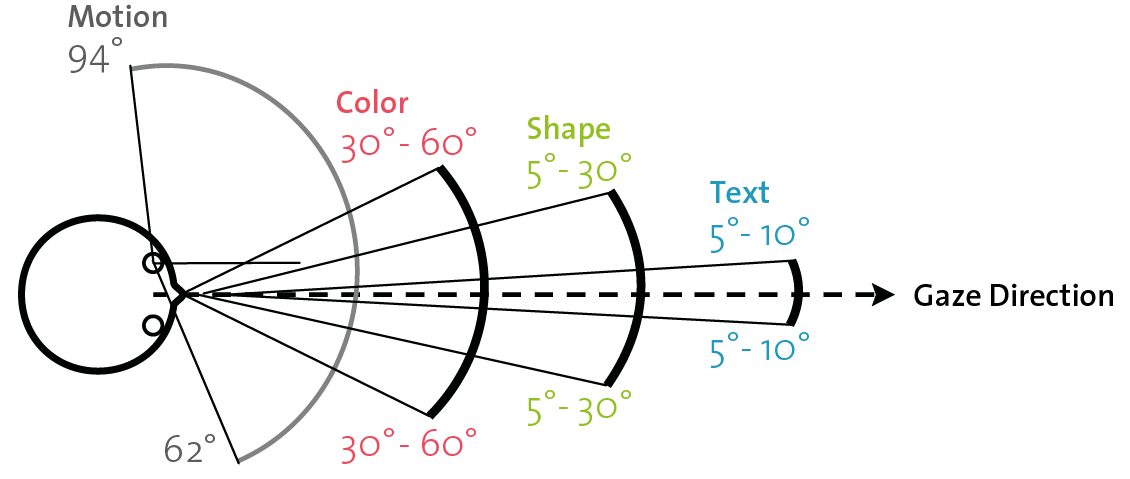
The picture is describing the visual perception in the human's field of view. It shows the differentiable Areas and Angels for Perception of Motion, Color, Shape & Text.

While most of these factors mentioned above become problematic when both eyes are covered with displays, a single display resting in the peripheral vision can be considered to be unproblematic, since it does not permanently influence the perceived picture of the real world.

As mentioned earlier, there are two types of information being perceivable with a peripheral head mounted display: (1) detailed information: when consciously focusing on the display and (2) peripheral information: through the human's visual perception, when focusing at the 'real world'. (see also picture above)

Most obvious changes are “motion”, which can be perceived over the whole spectrum of the FOV. In a smaller angle, change in color is also quite well perceivable (see figure). In contrast, perceiving shapes and reading text requires very dedicated attention of the pupil. However, when being very focused on a dedicated task, rough changes in shapes are still perceivable in a peripheral way. Even in the field of Human-Computer Interaction, there have been investigations on this visual “peripheral channel”, such as peripheral color perception with eyeglasses. Furthermore, researchers proposed to additionally utilize an eye tracker for a peripheral head-mounted display, in order to improve user experience. There has also been investigations on which display positions are most suitable. It has been found out that notifications presented at the middle and bottom areas of our human vision is more noticeable. However, top and middle positions are less distracting and more comfortable and preferred by the users. Among all the positions, the middle right position was found to strike the best balance between noticeability, comfort, and distraction.

While most HMDs suffer badly of the effects of binocular rivalry, Depth of Field and Phoria it is different for the PHMD. Since the PHMD is not totally covering the FOV and also not augmenting information on real objects, it is not affected by known problems monocular HMDs usually suffer from, such as the effect of attention switching between reality and projection. Such problems have been figured out over centuries of airspace research and usually occur when trying to augment reality. These potential dangers, when operating in critical situations, such as taking part in traffic, are less pronounced for PHMDs.

== Peripheral Interaction ==
Since the PHMD is resting in the peripheral of the user's FOV, it has a high availability and can be quickly demanded by focusing it. Furthermore, significant changes - depending on the stimuli - of the screen content is still perceivable without focusing the display. This effect can be used to design peripheral information (e.g. such as visual notifications for incoming emails, approaching appointments, warnings). An efficient response to such perceived information could be accomplished in quick peripheral input, such as a quick hand movement. This way, the user is not being greatly interrupted while completing real world tasks. In Human-Computer Interaction research this is also denoted as Peripheral Interaction

Notwithstanding, suitable input modalities for PHMDs that are not socially awkward remain to be discovered. Negative or positive social effects by wearing a PHMD and devoting attention on the screen while taking part in a conversation might be present, but are not proven yet. In addition, taking part in traffic while focusing on a visual input modality can lead to a considerable decrease of attention to the road (see also Semantic memory & Multimodal Interaction). However, compared to smartphone interaction, a quick switch to real world tasks is attainable, because there is no need for getting the device out of a pocket or bag. Furthermore, a PHMD does not need to be held by the user's hands, which offers a fully hands-free interaction. Since it is always available, it can provide peripheral visual information at any time, whereas peripheral information on smartphone in a pocket is not at all or barely perceivable (e.g. in a club/discothèque, while walking).
