= Maddox rod =

Testing tool in optometry

The Maddox rod test can be used to subjectively detect and measure a latent, manifest, horizontal or vertical strabismus for near and distance. The test is based on the principle of diplopic projection. Dissociation of the deviation is brought about by presenting a red line image to one eye and a white light to the other, while prisms are used to superimpose these and effectively measure the angle of deviation (horizontal and vertical). The strength of the prism is increased until the streak of the light passes through the centre of the prism, as the strength of the prism indicates the amount of deviation present. The Maddox rod is a handheld instrument composed of red parallel plano convex cylinder lens, which refracts light rays so that a point source of light is seen as a line or streak of light. Due to the optical properties, the streak of light is seen perpendicular to the axis of the cylinder.

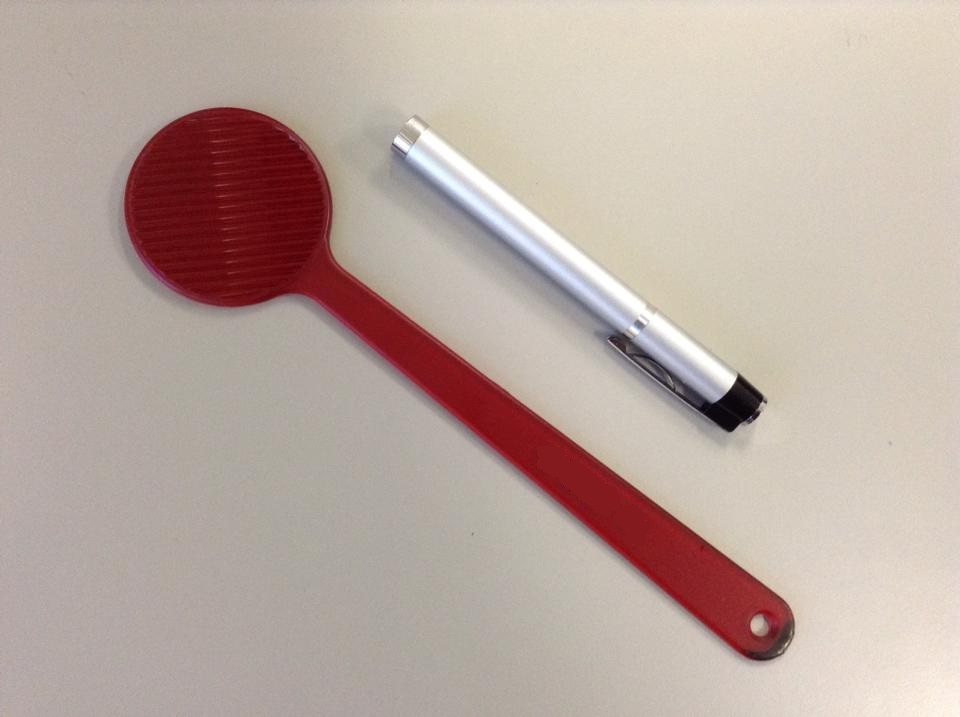
Maddox rod and pen torch used in Maddox rod testing

== Indication of use ==
The Maddox rod test should be used in cases of:

- Small to moderate (i.e..<25pd) vertical deviations where there is simultaneous perception and normal retinal correspondence (NRC)
- Decompensated phorias.
- Acquired strabismus (rather than congenital or early onset)

== Method of assessment ==
The method of assessing near and distance fixation is similar.

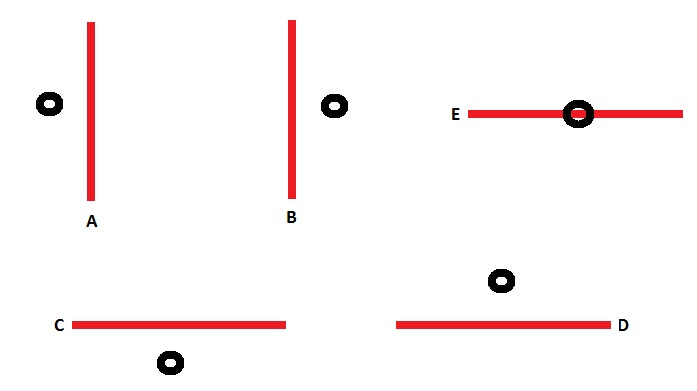
A) Esodeviation, B) Exodeviation, C) Hypo-deviation, D) Hyper-deviation, E) No deviation

Method for measuring horizontal deviations:

1. When performing the clinical test, the room lights should be dimmed and only one light source should be visible.
2. When testing at near, the patient is to fixate on light source at 33 cm, which is held at eye level. When testing at distance, the patient is to fixate on a light source at 6m.
3. Patient is instructed to fixate on the light source with both eyes opened.
4. The Maddox rod is then placed over the fixating eye.
5. To measure the horizontal deviation, the Maddox rod is placed in front of the right eye (it is done on both eyes) with the cylinder horizontal, making the red line vertical. The patient is then asked whether the white light is superimposed on the red line, or if it is to the left or right of the red line.
- If the patient saw a red line to the right and white light to the left, they are said to have esotropia or esophoria (uncrossed diplopia) in which base out (BO) prisms of increasing strength are used until the lines are superimposed.
- If the patient saw a red line to the left and white light to the right, they are said to have exotropia or exophoria (crossed diplopia) in which base in (BI) prisms of increasing strength are used until the lines are superimposed.

Maddox rod test tutorial

Method for measuring vertical deviations:

1. The Maddox Rod is held in front of the patient's right eye with the cylinders vertical, making the red line horizontal.
2. The patient is then asked whether the white light is superimposed on the red line or if it appears above or below the red line.

- If the line appears below the light, there will be a hyper-deviation in which base down prisms are used to measure and correct the deviation.
- If the line appears above the light, there will be a hypo-deviation and base up prisms are used measure and correct the deviation.
- If the white light is superimposed on the red line, there are no vertical deviations present

== Double Maddox rod test ==
The double Maddox rod test can also be used to assess torsion and measure cyclotropias.

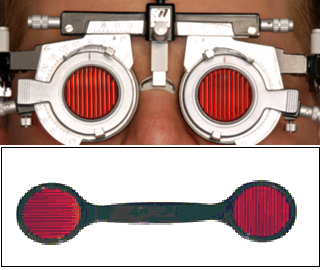
Double Maddox rod test with trial frames

1. The room lights should be dimmed and only one light source should be visible
2. Maddox rods are placed into the trial frames, one before each eye
3. Cylinders are placed into trial frame vertically, making the two red lines horizontal
4. Vertical prism (base-up, or base-down) can also be added into the trial frames to separate the two red lines; this avoids confusion if the patients claim that they only see one red line). The degree of deviation and the direction (incyclo or excyclo) can be determined by the angle of rotation that causes the line images to appear horizontal and parallel.
5. The amount of cyclodeviation is measured in degrees, utilised from the scale on the trial frame
6. When testing at near, the patient asked to fixate on light source at 33 cm, which is held at eye level. When testing at distance, the patient is to fixate on a light source at 6m.
7. Patient is instructed to fixate on the light source with both eyes opened
8. Patient is asked to rotate OR the examiner rotates the cylinders with the axis knob on the trial frame until the 2 red lines are parallel
9. This test can be repeated for the secondary and tertiary positions of gaze

== See also ==
- Strabismus
- Retinal correspondence
- Interpretation
- Parks–Bielschowsky three-step test
