= Fixation disparity =

Eye condition

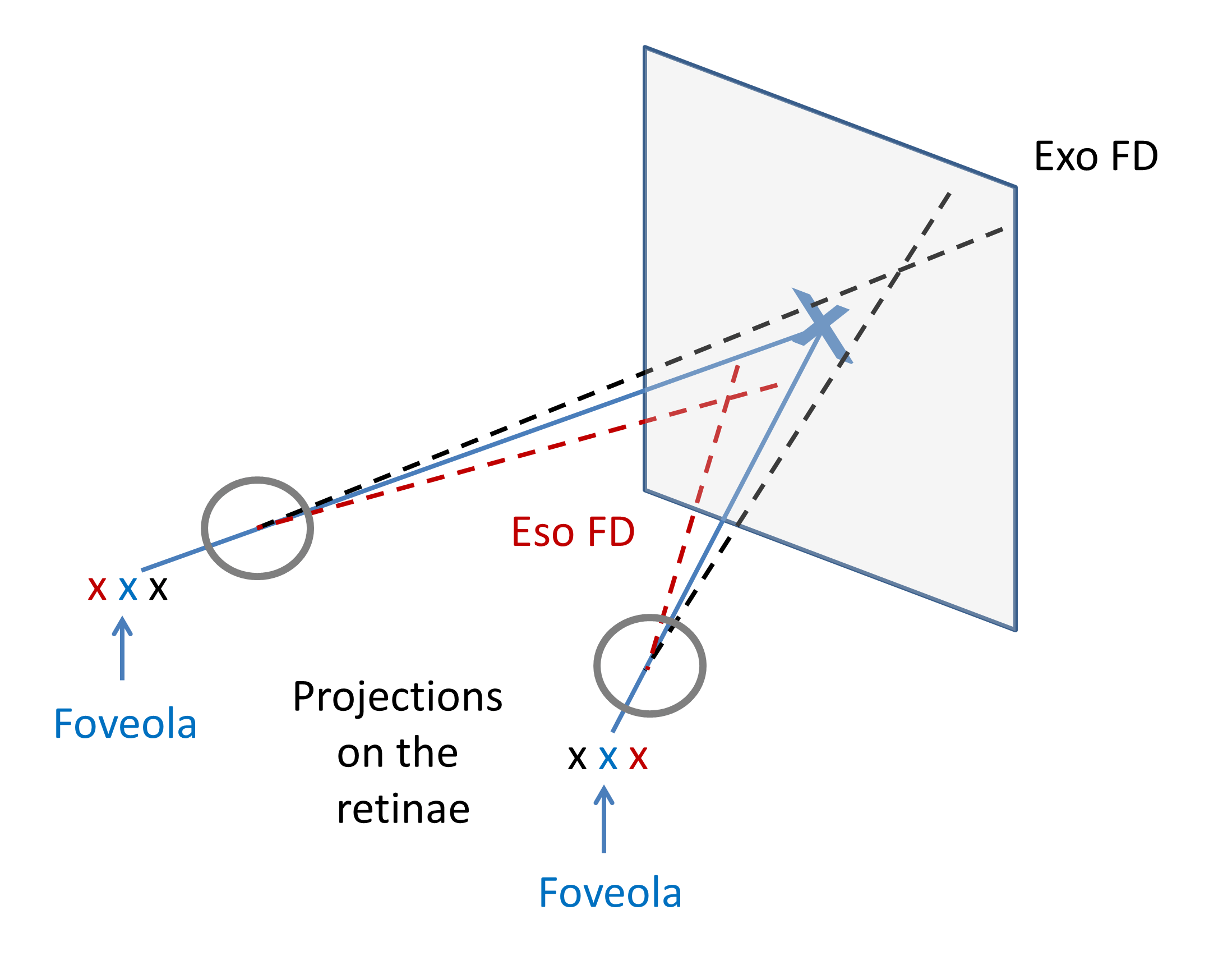
Fig.1: Visual axes of the two eyes in optimal binocular vision (blue) and in exo and eso fixation disparity (black and red, respectively).

Fixation disparity is a tendency of the eyes to drift in the direction of the heterophoria. While the heterophoria refers to a fusion-free vergence state, the fixation disparity refers to a small misalignment of the visual axes when both eyes are open in an observer with normal fusion and binocular vision. The misalignment may be vertical, horizontal or both. The misalignment (a few minutes of arc) is much smaller than that of strabismus. While strabismus prevents binocular vision, fixation disparity keeps binocular vision, however it may reduce a patient's level of stereopsis. A patient may have a different fixation disparity at distance than near. Observers with a fixation disparity are more likely to report eye strain in demanding visual tasks; therefore, tests of fixation disparity belong to the diagnostic tools used by eye care professionals: remediation includes vision therapy, prism eye glasses, or visual ergonomics at the workplace.

== Optimal binocular vision ==
In Fig. 1, the blue lines and characters illustrate the situation of optimal binocular vision: the extra-ocular muscles adjust the vergence angle between the two visual axes so that the fixation target X is projected in each eye onto the centre of the fovea, i.e. the location on the retina with the highest spatial resolution. The fixation point is projected in the two eyes onto retinal points that correspond to the same visual direction in space so that single vision is provided. This means that the visual axes intersect at the fixation target X. On the level of the visual cortex there is a perfect spatial overlap, i.e. the binocular disparity is zero and best binocular summation is possible. Such an optimal state occurs only in a minority of observers.

== Sub-optimal condition of fixation disparity ==
Most observers have a so-called "normal" binocular vision in the sense that they are able to view stereoscopically, but still many of these observers can have a sub-optimal condition in terms of a fixation disparity (FD). The vergence angle is slightly misadjusted so that the fixation point is projected slightly apart from the centre of the fovea. The visual axes may intersect in front (red lines) of the target plane, or behind (black line); these states of over- or under-convergence are referred to as eso- or exo FD, respectively (see Fig.1). In the visual cortex, a binocular disparity between the two retinal images remains. If this disparity is small enough, sensory and neural mechanisms in binocular neurons still attribute the same visual direction to these slightly disparate images and single vision is provided. This mechanism of sensory fusion with normal retinal correspondence operates within a certain limit of disparity, referred to as Panum's area. If the disparity is larger, the normal Panum's fusion mechanism is not sufficient; rather, in order to achieve fusion, a neural remapping of retinal correspondence can occur, which - however - prevents a high quality stereo vision.

Thus, in order to achieve single vision, two physiological mechanisms operate hand in hand:

1.) The motor mechanism of the extra-ocular eye muscles adjusts the vergence angle as precisely as possible for the individual, but a small vergence error may remain.

2.) Sensory (neural) mechanisms provide single vision by means of fusion within normal Panum's area or remapping of retinal correspondence (extended Panum's areas).

== Measurement ==
The methods of measuring fixation disparity can be explained based on the 1900 study by Hofmann and Bielschowsky, where they applied a modified Maddox wing: the right eye is presented with a horizontal scale, and the left eye is presented with an arrow. The observer perceives that the arrow points onto one of the numbers on the scale which indicates a possible vergence mis-adjustment. The Maddox wing, however, does not test binocular vision since no fusion target is present. For testing the state of binocular vision, Hofmann and Bielschowsky included an additional fusion stimulus to the two eyes and still found a perceived offset of scale and arrow; they referred to this offset as "Disparitätsrest" (in German), which means "residual disparity". Later, Ogle coined the term "fixation disparity".

More generally, this traditional vergence test is a subjective test in the sense that the observer reports their perception of the relative position of two test targets that are presented separately to the two eyes, i.e. dichoptic targets. This test relies on the assumption that retinal points are associated with visual directions in space. If physically aligned dichoptic targets appear subjectively aligned, they are projected onto corresponding retinal points and the visual axes intersect at the test target; thus, the vergence angle agrees with the viewing distance. In case of a deviating vergence state, the dichoptic targets need to have a certain physical horizontal offset in order to be perceived in line. These subjective measures agree with objective recordings with eye trackers, if no fusion stimulus is involved.

For measuring subjective fixation disparity, researchers as Ogle, Sheedy and Saladin, Mallett, Wesson constructed test instrumentation including fusion targets and dichoptic targets using cross-polarized filters in front of the eyes; some of these devices are commercially available. If the dichoptic targets are presented to the observer in physical alignment, the angular amount (in the unit minutes of arc) of subjective fixation disparity is indicated by the perceived misalignment of the two dichoptic targets. This can be compensated by the patient's individual amount of a prism eye glass (in the unit prism dioptre) so that the patient perceives alignment. The latter prism needed to reduce the fixation disparity to zero is referred to as aligning prism (earlier called associated phoria). Instrumentations such as the Disparometer, the Mallett-unit, or the Wesson Card differ in the type of fusion target: some use small central fixation letters, while others use more peripheral fusion targets. The instruments can be swung through 90° to measure any vertical fixation disparity. The test devices can also be used to detect suppression.

The above studies of subjective fixation disparity assumed - partly implicitly - that the dichoptic targets would indicate the vergence misalignment of the visual axes muscles, i.e. the vergence error, as it can be measured with eye tracking methods. This seemed to be justified by the first objective recording of fixation disparity made in 1960 by Hebbard with an eye tracking method based on small mirrors fixed onto contact lenses: he found agreement between the two measures (in the one observer tested). However, subsequent studies found that the objective recordings with eye trackers can differ substantially from the subjective test results with dichoptic targets: with central fusion targets and closely adjacent dichoptic targets, the subjective measure can be about 10 times smaller than the objective measure. When the dichoptic targets are gradually shifted by some degree away from the fusion target, then the two measures become more and more similar. This was interpreted as a change in retinal correspondence in the sense that the visual direction associated with the dichoptic targets is modified in the vicinity of the fusion target.

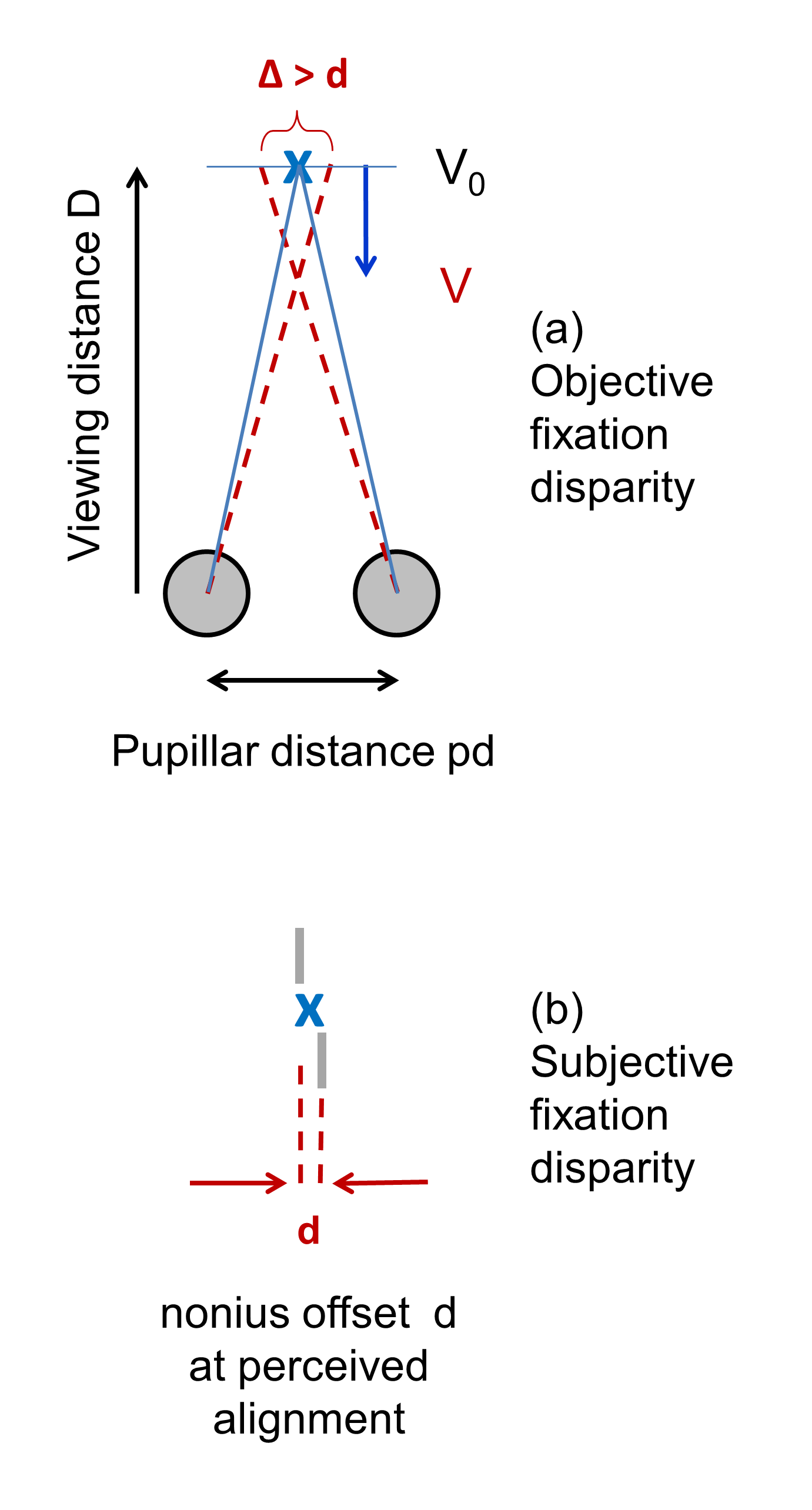
Fig. 2: Definition of the two types of fixation disparity

== Objective versus subjective fixation disparity ==
Given the discrepancy between objective measures with eye trackers and subjective measures with dichoptic targets, different definitions should be applied to the two types (see Fig. 2):

· Objective fixation disparity (oFD) is defined as the oculomotor vergence error that can only be measured with eye trackers, i.e. oFD = V – V_{0} . This is the difference between the vergence angle in binocular vision (V, red line in Fig. 2a) and the optimal vergence state when a target is projected in each eye onto the center of the foveola (V_{0}=2 arc tan ((pd)/2)/D), blue line in Fig. 2a). V_{0} is estimated from the monocular calibration of the eye tracker, i.e. the left eye is covered when the right eye calibration is made and vice versa; this procedure assumes that in monocular vision a target is projected onto the centre of the foveola.

· Subjective fixation disparity (sFD) is defined as the angular amount of the offset between dichoptic targets that need to be adjusted to a certain offset d so that the observer perceives the dichoptic targets in alignment (see the pair of nonius lines in Fig. 2b). Note that this definition of sFD = arctan (d/D) does not refer to the current vergence angle. The resulting subjective fixation disparity may depend on the spatial arrangement of dichoptic targets and fusion targets.

The discrepancy between oFD and sFD is shown in Fig. 2 in that the disparity ∆ between the two visual axes is typically larger than angular amount of the nonius offset d.

== Physiological properties ==
A fixation disparity is not constant within a certain observer, but can vary depending on the viewing conditions. If test prisms with increasing amount are placed in front of the observer's eyes, the fixation disparity changes in the eso direction with base-in prisms and in the exo direction with base-out prisms (Fig. 3). These prisms force the eyes to change the vergence angle while the viewing distance remains unchanged. Prism-induced fixation disparity curves (prism FD-curves) can be characterized by the following parameters:

- the y-intercept refers to the naturally occurring fixation disparity without a prism (FD_{0})
- the x-intercept gives the amount of a prism (P_{0}) that compensates a naturally occurring fixation disparity. This x-intercept is also referred to as aligning prism or – in earlier times – as associated phoria when the subjective nonius method was used (sP_{0})
- the slope of the curve near zero prism load

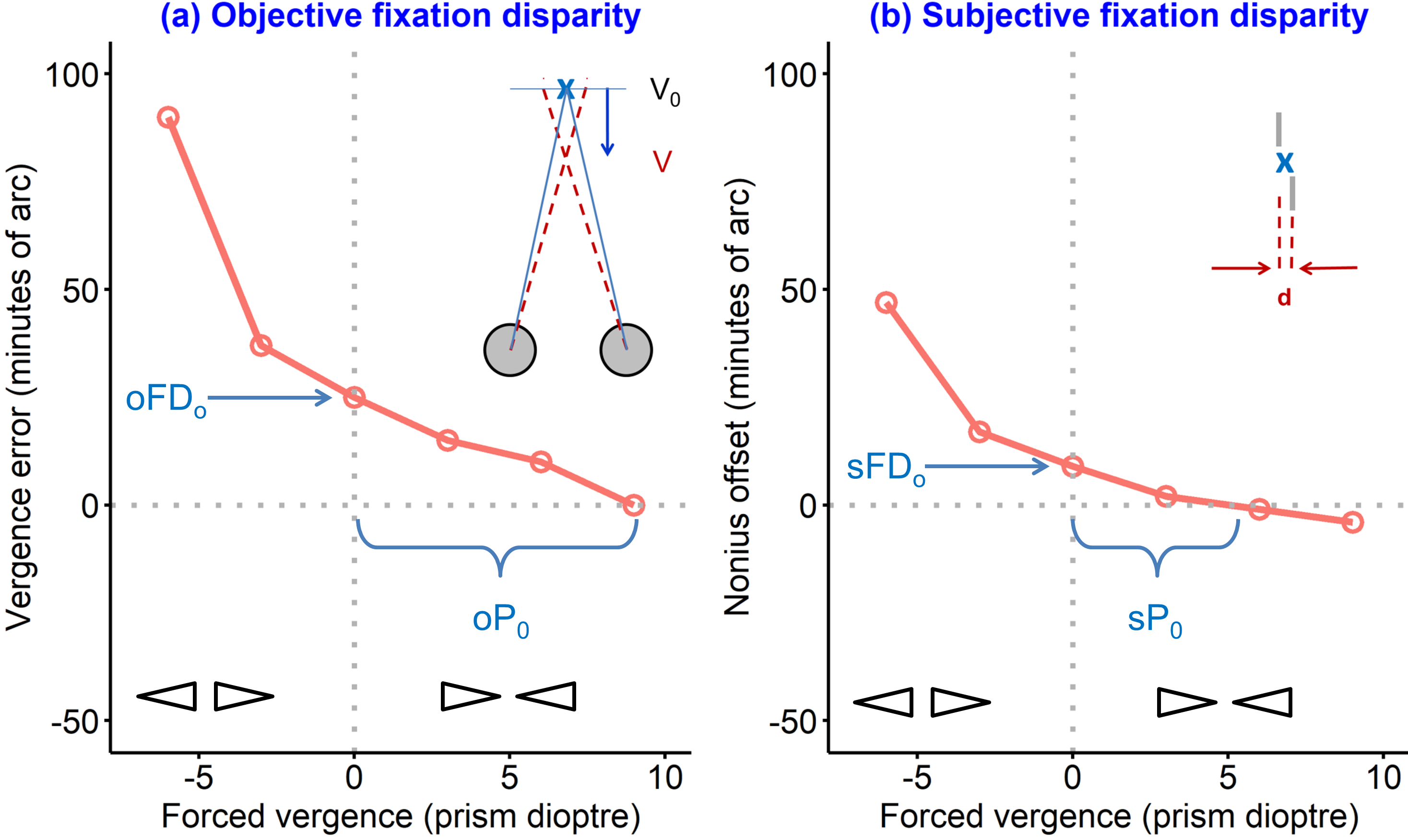
Fig. 3: Fixation disparity as a function of the forced vergence angle which is induced by base-in prisms and base-out prisms in front of the eyes.

These prism FD-curves have widely been used for subjective fixation disparity and the clinical implications are described below. Only more recently, subjective and objective prism FD-curves have been measured simultaneously: In principle both measures have a similar form of these curves, but they can differ quantitatively; typically, oFD is much larger than sFD. A comparison of subjective versus objective measures revealed a significant correlation (about r = 0.5 – 0.7) for the y-intercept (sFD_{0} versus oFD_{0}), but not for the slope.

In natural vision without prisms, the vergence state varies as a function of the viewing distance of the target: the subjective fixation disparity may shift towards more exo states from far-vision to near-vision. The effect of proximity is different for objective and subjective fixation disparity.

During reading of text material, the objective fixation disparity can be measured with eye trackers in the moments of fixation. This reading fixation disparity has the following properties:

- Fusion is maintained despite a fixation disparity during a reading fixation
- The reading fixation disparity reaches a minimum at a certain moment in time during the fixation
- The reading fixation disparity shifts to more eso conditions in the course of reading a line from left to right
- Blurring the text makes the reading fixation disparity more exo
- The reading fixation disparity is smaller when the text characters have a more pronounced periodic spatial structure

== Clinical diagnostic criteria ==
Fixation disparity can differ considerably between observers with normal binocular vision. The following conditions of subjective fixation disparity tend to be more prevalent in observers with eye strain.

Near-vision subjective fixation disparity (sFD_{0}) tends to be larger in the exo direction and the aligning prisms (sP_{0}) tends to be more base-in, suggesting that the eyes tend to under-converge. Most of these studies used the Mallett-unit, which consists of a small central fixation letter X surrounded by two letters O, one on each side of X.

The prism FD-curve (measured subjectively in near vision) tends to have a steeper slope (see Fig. 3b), meaning that the binocular system is not able to reach a small fixation disparity when vergence is forced by prisms in the base-in and base-out direction. This evidence came predominantly from studies with the Disparometer, an instrument that allows presenting dichoptic nonius lines with different amounts of offset to find a particular physical offset that leads to perceived alignment. These nonius lines are presented within a circular contour of 1.5 deg diameter that is viewed binocularly.

The proximity FD-curve (measured subjectively as a function of viewing distance) tends to be steeper, meaning that the binocular system is not able to keep the fixation disparity small, if a target is shifted closer in the range of about 100 to 20 cm. This evidence came from studies using a computer-controlled test stimulus including a central fusion stimulus.

All the above measures in studies of eye strain refer to the subjective fixation disparity, because the procedure with dichoptic targets is technically easy and therefore can conveniently be applied in the clinical setting with some commercial test devices. Some of the cited studies found, that measures of subjective fixation disparity are a better diagnostic criterion for eye strain than the heterophoria, i.e. the vergence state without a fusion stimulus. The technically more complex eye tracking technology for measuring objective fixation disparity has not yet been investigated in relation to eye strain.

== Remediation in observers with eye strain ==
Given that an observer has a certain fixation disparity and suffers from eye strain, one may consider some of the following ways of remediation.

Eye glasses with an included prism power is the optical method to reduce a fixation disparity. Different procedures have been proposed to determine the required amount of prism for the individual. Based on prism-FD curves (Fig. 3b), one can find the aligning prism sP_{0} that nullifies the naturally prevailing fixation disparity sFD_{0}. This test procedure is typically made in near vision of 40 cm, e.g. with the Mallett-unit, the Disparometer, or the Wesson card (see above). Experimental evidence for the effectiveness of the aligning prism came from a study of reading speed and corresponding preferences of prism eye glasses. A different approach was suggested by H.-J. Haase who proposed a set of dichoptic target tests with both central and more peripheral fusion targets and additional stereo tests that were predominantly used in far vision. Such prisms alleviated eye strain and remained stable over time. The usefulness of prism eye glasses has been criticized since the initial fixation disparity may reappear again after some time due to the adaptability of the vergence system. One may consider, however, that vergence tends to be less adaptive in observers with eye strain so that in these observers the prisms may permanently reduce a naturally prevailing fixation disparity.

Visual ergonomics of a computer workstation may take into account the individual proximity FD-curve: individuals with a larger exo fixation disparity at near may prefer a longer viewing distance where the fixation disparity is smaller.

Visual vergence training (also referred to as orthoptic exercises or vision therapy) aims to improve the physiological condition of binocular vision with eye movement exercises, including e.g. frequent dynamic vergence changes between near and far vision. The effectiveness has been confirmed both in terms of alleviation of visual symptoms and in better physiological conditions, e.g. the prism-FD curves became more flat. The physiological effect of visual vergence training has also been confirmed for other vergence functions.

== See also ==
- Diplopia
- Eye examination
- Heterophoria
- Ocular dominance
- Vision therapy
