= Reciprocal innervation =

Principle of pairs of opposing muscles

René Descartes (1596–1650) was one of the first to conceive a model of reciprocal innervation (in 1626) as the principle that provides for the control of agonist and antagonist muscles. Reciprocal innervation describes skeletal muscles as existing in antagonistic pairs, with contraction of one muscle producing forces opposite to those generated by contraction of the other. For example, in the human arm, the triceps acts to extend the lower arm outward while the biceps acts to flex the lower arm inward. To reach optimum efficiency, contraction of opposing muscles must be inhibited while muscles with the desired action are excited. This reciprocal innervation occurs so that the contraction of a muscle results in the simultaneous relaxation of its corresponding antagonist.

A common example of reciprocal innervation, is the effect of the nociceptive (or nocifensive) reflex, or defensive response to pain, otherwise commonly known as the withdrawal reflex; a type of involuntary action of the body to remove the body part from the vicinity of an offending object by contracting the appropriate muscles (usually flexor muscles), while relaxing the extensor muscles, allowing smooth movement.

The concept of reciprocal innervation as applicable to the eye is also known as Sherrington's law (after Charles Scott Sherrington), wherein increased innervation to an extraocular muscle is accompanied by a simultaneous decrease in innervation to its specific antagonist, such as the medial rectus and the lateral rectus in the case of an eye looking to one side of the midline. When looking outward or laterally, the lateral rectus of one eye must contract via increased innervation, while its antagonist, the medial rectus of the same eye - shall relax. The converse would occur in the other eye, both eyes demonstrating the law of reciprocal innervation.

The significance of Descartes' Law of Reciprocal Innervation has been additionally highlighted by recent research and applications of bioengineering concepts, such as optimal control and quantitative models of the motor impulses sent by the brain to control eye motion.

== See also ==
- Reciprocal inhibition
- Hering's law of equal innervation
- Dissociated vertical deviation
- Orthoptics
