= Lancaster red-green test =

- Purpose: measures strabismus

In the fields of optometry and ophthalmology, the Lancaster red-green test is a binocular, dissociative, subjective cover test that measures strabismus in the nine diagnostic positions of gaze.

The test is named after Walter Brackett Lancaster, who introduced it in 1939.

== Test procedure ==
The patient wears red-green glasses, and two lights (one red, one green) are used, so that the patient thus sees each light with a different eye. One light is held by the clinician, the other by the patient. The clinician points the light to a screen, requesting the patient to bring the second light to align on top of it. The patient's eye positions are measured while the patient performs the test.

Advantageously, monocular occlusion is applied before the test for at least 30 minutes. This largely eliminates the neurologically learned fusional vergence tone ("vergence adaptation") that is present in patients who are able to achieve fusion in a limited area of gaze, as is often the case for patients with incomitant strabismus.

== Scope ==
The Lancaster red-green test quantifies comitant and incomitant misalignments. It accurately assesses horizontal and vertical misalignments (heterotropia, heterophoria) as well as torsional misalignments (cyclotropia, cyclophoria) in all nine diagnostic gaze positions.

(Comitancy means that there is the same misalignment in all gaze directions. Incomitant misalignment, that is, a different misalignment of the eyes in different gaze directions, is typically present in patients with paralytic, mechanical or restrictive strabismus. The test allows to determine and accurately quantify also latent forms of strabism heterophoria).

There also exists a computerized version of the Lancaster red-green test.
