= Recon Instruments =

Defunct Canadian technology company

Recon Instruments Inc.

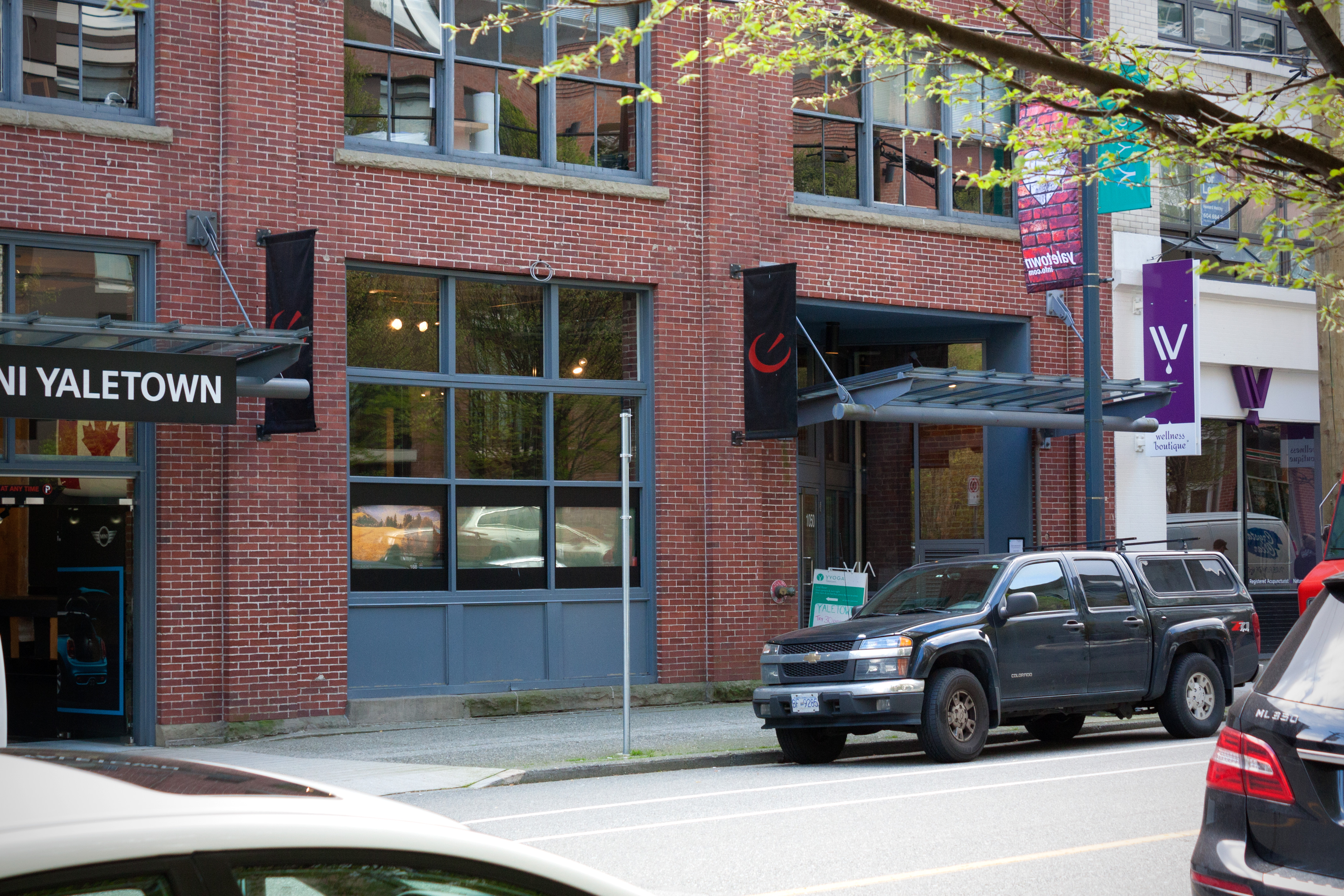
- Former Recon Labs, Vancouver, BC
- Industry: Smartglasses, wearable computers
- Founded: January 17, 2008
- Founders: Dan Eisenhardt, Hamid Abdollahi, Fraser Hall, Darcy Hughes
- Defunct: summer 2017
- Fate: acquired by Intel Corporation, closed in 2017
- Headquarters: Vancouver, British Columbia, Canada
- Area served: North America, Europe, Japan, Australia
- Parent: Intel Corporation
- Website: ReconInstruments.com

Recon Instruments Inc. was a Canadian technology company that produced smartglasses and wearable displays marketed by the company as "heads-up displays" for sports. (However, none of Recon's products contained a transparent display element delivering actual see-through capability and can thus be considered heads-up displays in the true meaning of the term.) Recon's products delivered live activity metrics, GPS maps, and notifications directly to the user's eye. Recon's first heads-up display offering was released commercially in October 2010, roughly a year and a half before Google introduced Google Glass.

Recon received investments from companies including Motorola Solutions and Intel. It also partnered with enterprise software vendors in order to make its latest smart eyewear device, the Jet, suitable for industrial applications.

On June 17, 2015, Recon was acquired by Intel. Recon then described itself as "an Intel company."

In June 2017, Intel announced that all remaining Recon Instruments products were going to be discontinued by the end of the year. According to a Bloomberg report in October 2017, Intel had in fact completely closed its Recon Instruments division already in early summer 2017.

== History ==
The technology behind Recon Instruments' products was born in September 2006 from an integrated MBA project. That project was undertaken by co-founders Dan Eisenhardt, Hamid Abdollahi, Fraser Hall, and Darcy Hughes at the University of British Columbia, Robert H. Lee Sauder School of Business.

Recon Instruments incorporated in January 2008, operating from small office and lab spaces rented from the University of British Columbia. In April 2010, the company moved to its current headquarters in the Yaletown area of downtown Vancouver. As of March 2015, Recon is still led by co-founders Dan Eisenhardt and Hamid Abdollahi.

=== Discovery and prototyping ===
Recon's co-founders originally looked into developing a HUD product for swimmers. Eisenhardt, a competitive swimmer himself, believed a HUD would be a valuable replacement for the clock at the side of the pool. Eisenhardt and his fellow founders developed the idea while studying at the University of British Columbia. However, a patent already existed for swimming goggles with a heads-up display. Because of that patent and the challenges presented by the technology's small form factor and intended operating conditions, the team eventually chose to focus on a winter sports product. The co-founders subsequently turned this school project into their first retail product, which was distributed globally in October 2010.

=== Investors ===
Recon has received investments from both venture-capital firms and other technology companies.

In January 2012, Recon received $10 million in Series A funding from Vanedge Capital and Kopin Corporation. Vanedge Capital is a Canadian venture capital firm that specializes in "interactive entertainment and digital media businesses." Kopin Corporation is a U.S. firm known for microdisplays aimed at mobile electronics.

In September 2013, Intel Capital, the venture capital arm of Intel, announced that it had invested in Recon. Details of the deal were not disclosed. However, the announcement described wearables as "an area of significant focus" for Intel Capital, and it said the investment would allow Recon to "accelerate product development, marketing and global sales, as well as gain access to Intel Capital's expertise in manufacturing, operations and technology."

In April 2014, Motorola Solutions announced an investment in Recon. Motorola Solutions describes itself as a provider of communications equipment for "government and enterprise customers." The terms of the deal were not made public. In July 2014, Motorola Solutions demonstrated a Recon product as a piece of kit for law enforcement personnel.

=== Intel acquisition ===
On June 17, 2015, Recon was acquired by Intel. The value of the deal was initially reported to be as high as Can$175 million. However, this sum was not confirmed by Recon Instrument's Dan Eisenhardt, and was later generally considered inaccurate. After the acquisition, Recon stayed in Vancouver and planned to make use of Intel's technological resources in order to "develop smart device platforms for a broader set of customers and market segments."

=== Closing of Recon Instruments in 2017 ===
In June 2017, it became known that Intel intended to discontinue all remaining Recon Instruments products, i.e., Recon Jet and Recon Jet Pro. Around the same time, Recon Instruments ceased all activities on both social media and its own website. According to a Bloomberg report in October 2017, Intel had in fact completely closed its Recon Instruments division already in early summer 2017.

== Hardware ==
Recon's first products were smart goggles and what the company marketed (incorrectly) as "heads-up displays" aimed at the winter sports market. More recently, the company broadened its focus with the Jet, a smart eyewear device designed for activities like cycling and running.

=== Technology overview ===
All of Recon Instrument's products were essentially head-worn, self contained mobile devices equipped with GPS and environmental sensors. A near-eye display was provided in the form of a single non-translucent (solid) micro display situated below and to the side of one eye. This required the wearer to glance down and to the side in order to read the screen contents. Recon's head-worn displays were therefore peripheral head-mounted displays rather than head-up displays in the common meaning of the term; much less were they able to deliver an augmented reality experience due to their lack of see-through capabilities.

=== Transcend ===
Recon's first commercial product, the Transcend, was released in October 2010. It was designed for winter sports and featured a small LCD screen embedded into a snow goggle frame by eyewear maker Zeal Optics, which is now a subsidiary of Maui Jim, Inc. The Transcend displayed data like GPS maps, temperature, speed, and altitude, and it allowed users to share that data. In 2011, the Transcend earned the Consumer Electronics Show's Best of Innovations award for Personal Electronics.

=== MOD and MOD Live ===
Recon's MOD and MOD Live heads-up displays were released in November 2011. Unlike the Transcend, the MOD and MOD Live were sold separately from snow goggles. Users could fit them into specially designed "Recon-Ready" goggles from eyewear makers including Uvex, Alpina, and Briko. Oakley also integrated the MOD Live into a specially designed snow goggle frame and marketed the resulting product as the Airwave.

Both the MOD and MOD Live offered functionality similar to the Transcend's, but the MOD Live introduced the ability to connect to smartphones via Bluetooth. When connected to a user's smartphone, the MOD Live could display caller ID and SMS notifications.

=== Snow2 ===
Introduced in November 2013, the Snow2 is Recon's latest standalone heads-up display. It features a faster processor than the MOD and MOD Live along with improved display brightness and contrast, longer battery life, 802.11a/b/g/n Wi-Fi connectivity, and Made for iPhone (MFi) certification.

Like the MOD Live, the Snow2 can connect to smartphones in order to display call and SMS notifications. It also lets users connect to Facebook and track their friends using the GPS-enabled maps feature.

The Snow2 heads-up display is designed to fit inside compatible eyewear from Oakley, Smith, Scott, Uvex, Alpina, Briko, and Zeal. Oakley has integrated the Snow2 into a snow goggle frame and markets the resulting product as the Airwave 1.5. Despite running an Android-based operating system, the Airwave 1.5 is sold by Apple through both Apple retail stores and the online Apple Store.

=== Jet ===
Unlike the Snow2, the Jet combines a heads-up display with a Recon-designed sunglass frame and polarized lenses.

The Jet is aimed at activities like cycling and running rather than winter sports. Recon has also partnered with enterprise software firms SAP and APX Labs with the aim of making Jet suitable for industrial applications in fields like manufacturing and oil-and-gas extraction. Motorola Solutions, one of Recon's investors, has also demonstrated the Jet as law-enforcement equipment, as well.

Built into the Jet are GPS connectivity as well as sensors to track metrics like speed, pace, distance, and elevation gain. Users can also connect third-party sensors via ANT+ and smartphones via Bluetooth. Like the MOD Live and Snow2, the Jet can display call and SMS notifications from user's smartphones.

The Jet is powered by a 1 GHz processor with dual ARM Cortex-A9 cores. Its processor, display, and camera sit on the right side of the frame, while the battery sits on the left, evening out weight distribution. The battery is designed to be interchangeable, as well.

== Software ==
=== ReconOS ===
Recon devices run ReconOS, an operating system based on Android.

ReconOS has a custom user interface designed for small displays. It shows live activity metrics and lets users share those metrics to social media. ReconOS also features GPS maps that display the locations of nearby friends and rotate depending on the user's head orientation. When a Recon device is paired with a smartphone, ReconOS can display call and SMS notifications, and it allows users to control the phone's music playback.

ReconOS runs third-party applications, as well. Developers can write ReconOS apps using the Recon SDK.

=== Engage website ===
The Recon Engage website allows users to browse, display, and share activity metrics recorded with a Recon device. Users can also tag friends, share photos, download software updates and third-party applications for their Recon device, and see their activities mapped in an embedded Google Maps pane.

=== Engage mobile app ===
Available for iOS and Android, the Recon Engage mobile app lets users view and share their activity metrics, and it also allows compatible Recon devices to connect to smartphones. Connecting a Recon device to a smartphone enables features like friend tracking, call and SMS notification display, and music playback controls.

=== Recon Uplink ===
The Recon Uplink desktop application lets users register their Recon device, update the device's software, and sync data from the device to an Engage account. When used with Jet, the Uplink application can download photos from the device to the user's computer.

=== Recon SDK ===
Aimed at developers, the Recon SDK includes the tools, documentation, and samples necessary to write third-party applications for Recon's Jet and Snow2 devices. The Recon SDK API augments the Android API with extensions specific to Recon device hardware. Developers do not need to register or to pay a fee to access the Recon SDK.

=== App center ===
By visiting the app center on Recon's Engage website, users can download third-party apps for Recon's Jet and Snow2 products. Among the apps on offer are Refuel, a "smart nutrition" app that tells users when to eat and rehydrate during activities, and MyGoproRemote2, which makes it possible to control GoPro cameras using a Jet or Snow2.

== Reception and criticism ==
The flagship product of Recon Instruments, Recon Jet, launched in 2015 to mixed reviews, with Engadget calling the goggles "expensive fitness glasses with potential to be better". Reviewers praised Recon Instruments for bringing the first fitness-oriented head-worn displays to market. Frequently voiced criticisms were the high price point, insufficient battery life, wearer distraction and limited field of view by the non-see-through (solid) micro display, unsatisfactory GPS lag and accuracy, complex user interface, and general software problems.

== See also ==
- Denno Coil - science fiction depicting similar AR glasses
- Epson Moverio BT-100 and BT-200 - stereoscopic augmented-reality glasses
- EyeTap - eye-mounted camera and HUD
- Google Glass - AR head-mounted display project by Google
- Google Goggles – query-by-image search engine
- Golden-i - HMD computer
- Instabeat - HUD for swimming
- Pristine - video collaboration software for smart glasses
- SixthSense - wearable AR device
- Steve Mann - researcher and inventor known for his work on wearable computing
- Vuzix - augmented-reality smart glasses
- Solos Smart Glasses - Augmented Cycling Smart Glasses
