= Ernest Maddox =

British ophthalmologist

Ernest Edmund Maddox (1863 – 4 November 1933) was a British surgeon and ophthalmologist. He was a specialist in abnormal binocular vision and phorias (heterophoria in particular). He made advances in optical treatments and invented several devices to better investigate eye conditions, including Maddox rod, double prism Maddox, red glass Maddox, Maddox cross and Maddox wing. As a keen amateur astronomer he also invented the starfinder, a device to home in on stars and constellations.

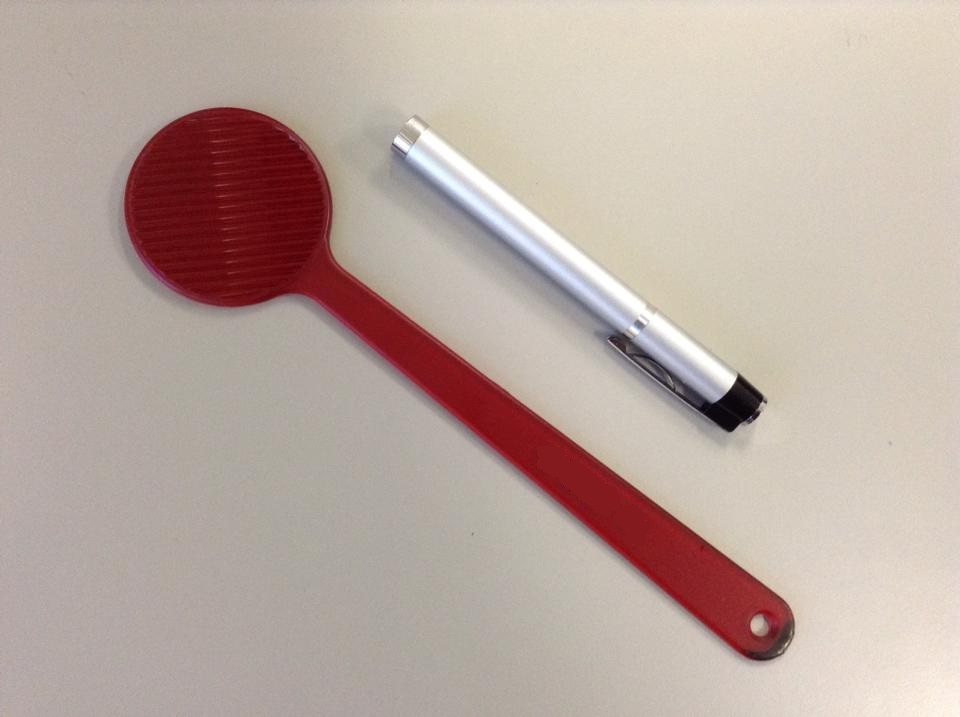
Maddox rod and pen torch used in Maddox rod testing

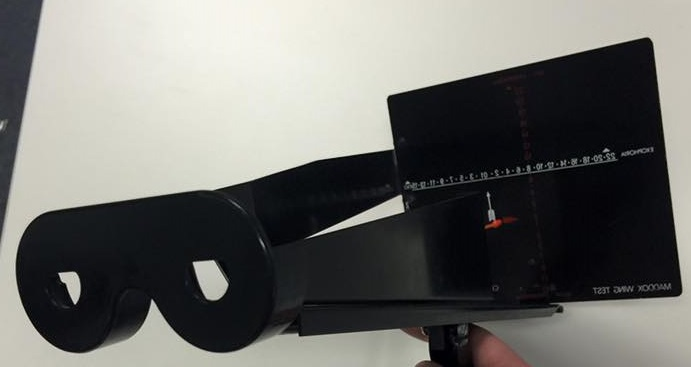
The Maddox Wing

== Life ==
He was born in Shipton-under-Wychwood, the son of J. F. Maddox.

He was educated at Mill Hill School then studied medicine at the University of Edinburgh, graduating with an MB CM in 1882 and gaining his doctorate (MD) in 1889. In 1894 he was elected a fellow of the Royal College of Surgeons of Edinburgh. He worked for a decade in Edinburgh alongside Dr Argyll Robertson.

In the 1890s he was living at 7 Manor Place in Edinburgh's West End. His neighbour was the lighthouse engineer, Charles Alexander Stevenson. In 1899 he won the British Medical Association's Middlemore Prize for services to ophthalmology.

Due to ill-health he headed for the warmer climates of the English coast and moved to Bournemouth to work at first the Royal Victoria Hospital with Dr Roberts-Thomson, then the Royal Boscombe and West Hants Hospital. He served as vice-president of the Ophthalmological Society of the United Kingdom and president of the ophthalmological section of the British Medical Association.

He died on 4 November 1933 in Bournemouth.

== Publications ==
- Accommodation and Convergence of the Eyes (1882)
- Tests and Studies of the Ocular Muscles (1898)
- Golden Rules of Refraction (1900)
- Clinical Use of Prisms and the Decentering of Lenses (1908)

== Family ==
In 1893 he married Grace Rivers daughter of Alexander Monteath of Broich and Duchally in Perthshire, who bore him thirteen children. His daughter Mary Maddox is generally recognised as the world's first orthoptist.
