= Orthoptics =

Sub-discipline of ophthalmology

Orthoptics is a profession allied to the eye care profession. Orthoptists are the experts in diagnosing and treating defects in eye movements and problems with how the eyes work together, called binocular vision. These can be caused by issues with the muscles around the eyes or defects in the nerves enabling the brain to communicate with the eyes. Orthoptists are responsible for the diagnosis and non-surgical management of strabismus (cross-eyed), amblyopia (lazy eye) and eye movement disorders. The word orthoptics comes from the Greek words ὀρθός orthos, "straight" and ὀπτικός optikοs, "relating to sight" and much of the practice of orthoptists concerns disorders of binocular vision and defects of eye movement. Orthoptists are trained professionals who specialize in orthoptic treatment, such as eye patches, eye exercises, prisms or glasses. They commonly work with paediatric patients and also adult patients with neurological conditions such as stroke, brain tumours or multiple sclerosis. With specific training, in some countries orthoptists may be involved in monitoring of some forms of eye disease, such as glaucoma, cataract screening and diabetic retinopathy.

== Effectiveness ==
For children, there is evidence that orthoptics is more effective at treating convergence insufficiency than home-based pencil or computer training; for adults the effectiveness is less evident.

== History ==
Orthoptics has a long history in supporting ophthalmic care. French ophthalmologist Louis Emile Javal began using ocular exercises to treat strabismus (squint) and described the practice of orthoptics in his writings in the late 19th century. Mary Maddox pioneered the orthoptic profession and was the first documented orthoptist. She was trained by her father, Ernest E. Maddox, in response to increasing patient demand and time needed to examine and treat patients. Ernest Maddox was a reputed ophthalmologist as well as the inventor of various instruments for investigating binocular vision. Mary Maddox started her own practice in London in the early 1920s and her first hospital clinic opened at the Royal Westminster Hospital in 1928. The first Australian hospital clinic with orthoptists was established at the Alfred Hospital in Melbourne in 1931.

== Current orthoptic practice ==
Orthoptists are mainly involved with diagnosing and managing patients with binocular vision disorders which relate to amblyopia, eye movement disorders, extraocular muscle balance such as with version, refractive errors, vergence, accommodation imbalances, positive relative accommodation and negative relative accommodation. They work closely with ophthalmologists to ensure that patients with eye muscle disorders are offered a full range of treatment options. According to the International Orthoptic Association, professional orthoptic practice involves the following:

- Primary activities
  - Ocular motility diagnosis and co-management
  - Vision screening. In the UK all school vision screening programmes for children between age 4–5 years is orthoptic led. Screening is either conducted by orthoptists or by health professionals who have received extensive training and certification from their local orthoptic department.
  - Assessment of special needs
  - Assessment and rehabilitation in neurological disorders
- Secondary activities
  - Low vision assessment and management
  - Glaucoma assessment and stable glaucoma management
  - Biometry (includes sonography work)
  - Fundus photography and screening
  - Visual electrodiagnosis
  - Retinoscopy and refraction, such as using a phoropter to assess refractive errors
- Further activities
  - Specific outpatient waiting list initiatives to reduce the delay for children referred to the eye clinic (filter screening)
  - Joint multidisciplinary children's vision screening clinics (orthoptics/optometry)
  - Organisation/prioritisation of the strabismus surgical admissions list according to agreed criteria
  - Assistance with surgical procedures

== Qualifications and training ==
In the US, students of orthoptics must attend two years of fellowship training. As of 2019, there were thirteen programs affiliated with medical facilities or universities in the US and three in Canada offering an orthoptic curriculum. In the United Kingdom, Austria, Italy, Switzerland and Germany, the orthoptic degree is a full time three-year course, including hospital placements to develop and refine clinical skills and specialism.

Admission criteria vary from school to school; however, national regulations require completion of a baccalaureate degree prior to sitting for the national certifying exams. A personal interview is customarily part of the admissions process. In the UK the majority of orthoptists are employed by the NHS in hospitals or community eye services. They contribute to the wider eye care teams, alongside ophthalmologists and optometrists.

== See also ==
- Bates method
- Diplopia
- Dissociated vertical deviation
- Esotropia
- Exotropia
- Eye care professional
- Eyepatch
- Haploscope
- Pediatric ophthalmology
- Pinhole glasses
- Vision therapy
- Vision rehabilitation
