= Cyclovergence =

Simultaneous torsion of both eyes to maintain focus on an object

Cyclovergence is the simultaneous occurring cyclorotation (torsional movement) of both eyes which is performed in opposite directions to obtain or maintain single binocular vision.

== Normal cyclovergence and cycloversion ==
Conjugate cyclorotations of the eye (that is, cyclorotations in the same direction) are called cycloversion. They mainly occur due to Listing's law, which, under normal circumstances, constrains the cyclorotation in dependence on the vertical and horizontal movements of the eye.

== Visually evoked cyclovergence ==
Listing's law, however, does not account for all cyclorotations. In particular, in the presence of cyclodisparity (that is, when two images are presented which would need to be rotated in relation to each other in order to allow visual fusion to take place), the eyes perform cyclovergence, rotating around their gaze directions in opposite directions, as a motor response to cyclodisparity.

Such additional, visually evoked cyclovergence appears to superimpose linearly onto the cycloversion due to Listing's law.

Visually induced cyclovergence of up to 8 degrees has been observed in normal subjects. Together with the 8 degrees that can usually be compensated by sensory means, this means that the normal human observer can achieve binocular image fusion in presence of cyclodisparity (also called orientation disparity in the case of a line image) of up to approximately 16 degrees. Larger cyclodisparity normally results in double vision. It has been shown that the tolerance of human stereopsis to cyclodisparity of lines (orientation disparity) is greater for vertical lines than for horizontal lines.

The visually evoked cyclovergence relaxes once the cyclodisparity is reduced to zero. The effect also relaxes when the eyes are presented with darkness; however, experiments show that in the latter case the cyclovergence does not disappear completely straight away.

Cyclovergence can also be evoked by cyclodisparity of the visual field; the cyclodisparity can be introduced by dove prisms. Here, use is made of the fact that a pair of dove prisms rotate an image optically if they are arranged one after the other and with an angular displacement relative to each other. Conversely, the range of cyclovergence-based cyclofusion can be trained using dove prisms that actively rotate the field of view: "The patient fixates a vertical line target, and the dove prism is rotated in the direction to increase the action of the insufficient muscle while fusion is maintained."

The cyclorotation of the eyes can normally not be performed under voluntary control; nonetheless it is possible to do so after extended practice. Voluntary cyclorotation after extended practice was first demonstrated in 1978.

== Measurement ==
It has long been known that the human visual system compensates for cyclical mismatch in such a way that cyclofusion and thereby stereo vision is achieved. There has been agreement on this point since the question was raised in 1891. However, for a long time the mechanism of the compensation was unclear: many thought that cyclofusion was due exclusively to high-level processing of the visual images, while others suggested a motor cyclovergence response. In 1975, motor cyclovergence was demonstrated for the first time with photographic methods.

Cyclovergence, and more generally torsional eye positions, can be measured using scleral coils or using video-oculography. Torsional eye positions can also be measured using fundus cyclometry, which is based on infrared scanning laser ophthalmoscopy.

There have been contradictory statements on whether cyclovergence can be measured subjectively, that is, by an evaluation of the subjects' own statements on whether lines in a scene appear at an angle in the two eyes. Recent evidence based on an analysis of the empirical horopter suggests that subjective estimates of cyclovergence are accurate if they are performed using horizontal lines to the left and to the right of the fixation, not vertical lines above and below it which would be affected by shear of retinal correspondence points.

== See also ==
- Cyclotropia
