= Heterophoria =

Eyes misaligning while at rest

- Specialty: Optometry Ophthalmology

Heterophoria is an eye condition in which the eyes at rest position (when not performing binocular fusion) do not point in the same direction. This condition can be esophoria, where the eyes tend to cross inward in the absence of fusion; exophoria, in which they diverge; hyperphoria, in which one eye points up or down relative to the other; or cyclophoria, in which one eye is rotated differently around its line of sight from that of the other. Phorias are known as 'latent squint' because the tendency of the eyes to deviate is kept latent (hidden) by fusion.

A person with two normal eyes has single vision (usually) because of the combined use of the sensory and motor systems. The motor system acts to point both eyes at the target of interest; any offset is detected visually, and the motor system corrects it. Heterophoria occurs only during dissociation of the left eye and right eye, when fusion of the eyes is absent. If one eye is covered (e.g., with a hand), the sensory information about the eye's position in the orbit is lost. Without this information, there is no stimulus to binocular fusion, and the eye will move to a position of "rest". The difference between this position and where it would be were the eye uncovered is the heterophoria. The opposite of heterophoria, where the eyes are straight when relaxed and not fusing, is called orthophoria. In contrast, fixation disparity is a very small deviation of the pointing directions of the eyes that accompanies binocular fusion.

Heterophoria is usually asymptomatic. This is when it is said to be "compensated." When fusional reserve is used to compensate for heterophoria, it is known as compensating vergence. In severe cases, when the heterophoria is not overcome by fusional vergence, sign and symptoms appear. This is called decompensated heterophoria. Heterophoria may lead to squint, also known as strabismus.

== Signs and symptoms ==
When the fusional vergence system can no longer hold back heterophoria, the phoria manifests. In this condition, the eyes deviate from the fixating position.

- VH (Vertical Heterophoria) is distinct from other visual conditions due to its ability to manifest as unrelated issues.
- Symptoms include chronic headaches, dizziness, and reading difficulties, even with 20/20 vision using corrective lenses.
- The effort to correct eye misalignment causes eye strain, leading to a range of symptoms that complicate diagnosis and treatment.
- Symptoms can mimic those of chronic fatigue or motion sickness, making VH difficult to recognize and diagnose due to its broad symptom spectrum and lack of widespread recognition.

== Cause ==
Heterophoria is the misalignment of the visual axis such that one or both eyes are not properly fixated to an object of interest. When the visual axis is misaligned in such a way, it is corrected by the fusional vergence system.

== Diagnosis ==
The cross-cover test, or alternating cover test is usually employed to detect heterophoria. One eye is covered, and then the cover is moved immediately over to the other eye. With heterophoria, when the cover is moved to the other eye, the eye that has just been uncovered can be seen to move from a deviated point. The difference between heterotropia and heterophoria can be easily understood as follows. With heterotropia, a correcting movement of the eye can be detected already by the simple cover test; with heterophoria, such correcting movement only takes place in the cross-cover test. People with heterophoria are able to create and maintain binocular fusion through vergence, and the cross-cover test purposely breaks this fusion, making the latent misalignment visible.

Whereas the cross-cover test allows a qualitative assessment to be done, a quantitative assessment of latent eye position disorders can be done using the Lancaster red-green test.

Ernest Maddox studied different types of phoria extensively throughout his career. He developed the Maddox rod test and double Maddox rod test which are especially sensitive to deviations of the eye. The tests must be performed in low light conditions, with a dim point light source in an environment absent of specular surfaces. The test came under heavy criticism during WW1 for its lack of accuracy; however it was discovered that operators had simply allowed too much light in the test room and had used a light source that was too bright. Even low levels of light stimulate fusion which is why it is imperative to perform the test with the minimum amount of light in order for the patient to observe a misalignment.
