= Dissociated vertical deviation =

Eye medical condition

Dissociated vertical deviation (DVD) is an eye condition which occurs in association with a squint, typically infantile esotropia. The exact cause is unknown, although it is logical to assume it is from faulty innervation of eye muscles.

== Presentation ==
The eye drifts upward spontaneously or after being covered. The condition usually affects both eyes, but can occur unilaterally or asymmetrically. It is often associated with latent or manifest-latent nystagmus and, as well as occurring with infantile esotropia, can also be found associated with exotropias and vertical deviations.

DVDs are usually controlled from occurring with both eyes open, but may become manifest with inattention. Usually some level of dissociative occlusion is required to trigger the brain to suppress vision in that eye and then not control a DVD from occurring. The level of dissociative occlusion required may involve using a red filter, a darker filter or complete occlusion (e.g. with a hand).

=== Onset ===
DVD typically becomes apparent between 18 months and three years of age; however, the difficulties of achieving the prolonged occlusion required for accurate detection in the very young make it possible that onset is generally earlier than these figures suggest.

== Mechanism ==
Dissociation refers to the situation where the innervation of one eye causes it to move involuntarily and independently of the other eye. Usually both eyes work together as described by Hering's and Sherrington's laws of innervation. A DVD is a slow upward and sometimes temporal movement of one eye, with cortical suppression of the vision in that eye while it is deviated. On returning downward and possibly inward to take up fixation, the DVD slow movement will be reversed.

The dissociative movement seen 'objectively' should not be confused with the dissociation that occurs 'subjectively' – as when the brain begins to not visualise both images simultaneously (by ignoring or suppressing vision in that eye).

== Diagnosis ==
A test called the Bielschowsky Darkening Wedge Test can be used to reveal and diagnose the presence of dissociated vertical deviation, although any (or no) amount of dissociative occlusion may also prompt it to occur.

The patient is asked to look at a light. One eye is covered and a filter is placed in front of the other eye. The density or opacity of this filter is gradually increased, and the behaviour of the eye under the cover (not of the eye beneath the filter) is observed. Initially, if DVD is present, the covered eye will have elevated, but as the filter opacity is increased the eye under the cover will gradually move downwards. This Bielschowsky phenomenon is present in over 50% of persons with prominent DVD, all the more if the DVD is asymmetric and amblyopia is present as well.

The Bielschowsky phenomenon is also present in the horizontal plane in patients with prominent DHD (dissociated horizontal deviation).

=== Differential diagnosis ===
DVD is often mistaken for over-action of the inferior oblique extra-ocular muscles. DVD can be revealed on ocular movement testing when one eye is occluded by the nose on lateral gaze. This eye will then elevate, simulating an inferior oblique over action. However, in a unilateral case, overaction of the superior rectus muscle in the unaffected dominant eye, can also be a causing factor as well as causing a V pattern exophoria.

== Treatment ==
Management of this condition is surgical and typically involves reducing the strength of the superior rectus muscle or anterior transposition of the inferior oblique muscle of the affected eyes.

Several different surgical procedures exist for the correction of DVD including: inferior oblique anteriorization, inferior oblique anteriorization plus resection, superior rectus recession, superior rectus recession plus posterior fixation suture, and inferior oblique myectomy, though there is insufficient evidence to determine which procedure results in the best outcomes for patients.

== See also ==
- Infantile esotropia
- Pediatric ophthalmology
- Strabismus
- Strabismus surgery
