= Orthophoria =

Normal alignment of the eyes

- Specialty: Ophthalmology

Orthophoria is a condition of binocular fixation in which the lines of vision meet at the object toward which they are directed, and is considered as a normal condition of balance of the ocular muscles of the two eyes. The condition opposite of orthophoria is heterophoria.
