= Fusional vergence =

Type of movement of the eyes

Fusional vergence is the movement of both eyes that enables the fusion of monocular images producing binocular vision. It is especially important when a person has heterophoria. Premotor cells for fusional vergence are located in the mesencephalic supraoculomotor area adjacent to the oculomotor nucleus.
