= Cyclotropia =

Rotation of one eye around the visual axis

- Specialty: Ophthalmology

Cyclotropia is a form of strabismus in which, compared to the correct positioning of the eyes, there is a torsion of one eye (or both) about the eye's visual axis. Consequently, the visual fields of the two eyes appear tilted relative to each other. The corresponding latent condition – a condition in which torsion occurs only in the absence of appropriate visual stimuli – is called cyclophoria. Cyclotropia and cyclophoria can be subsumed as cyclodeviation (or cyclic deviation), and the eye rotation about its visual axis is known as cyclorotation or cyclotorsion.

Cyclotropia is often associated with other disorders of strabism, can result in double vision, and can cause other symptoms, in particular head tilt.

In some cases, subjective and objective cyclodeviation may result from surgery for oblique muscle disorders; if the visual system cannot compensate for it, cyclotropia and rotational double vision (cyclodiplopia) may result. The role of cyclotropia in vision disorders is not always correctly identified. In several cases of double vision, once the underlying cyclotropia was identified, the condition was solved by surgical cyclotropia correction.

Conversely, artificially causing cyclotropia in cats leads to reduced vision acuity, resulting in a defect similar to strabismic amblyopia.

== Diagnosis ==
Cyclotropia can be diagnosed using a combination of subjective and objective tests. Before surgery, both subjective and objective torsion should be assessed.

Subjective tests for detecting cyclotropia include the Maddox rod test, the Bagolini striated lens test, the phase difference haploscope of Aulhorn, and the Lancaster red-green test (LRGT). Among these, the LRGT is the most complete.

The objective evaluation of the torsion can be performed reliably by means of fundus photography using landmarks like the fovea centralis and the optic disc. Experiments have also been made on whether cyclic deviations can be assessed by purely photographic means.

== Treatment ==
If only small amounts of torsion are present, cyclotropia may be without symptoms entirely and may not need correction, as the visual system can compensate small degrees of torsion and still achieve binocular vision (see also: cyclodisparity, cyclovergence). The compensation can be a motor response (visually evoked cyclovergence) or can take place during signal processing in the brain. In patients with cyclotropia of vascular origin, the condition often improves spontaneously.

Cyclotropia cannot be corrected with prism spectacles in the way other eye position disorders are corrected. (Nonetheless two Dove prisms can be employed to rotate the visual field in experimental settings.)

For cyclodeviations above 5 degrees, surgery has normally been recommended. Depending on the symptoms, the surgical correction of cyclotropia may involve a correction of an associated vertical deviation (hyper- or hypotropia), or a Harada–Ito procedure or another procedure to rotate the eye inwards, or yet another procedure to rotate it outwards. A cyclodeviation may thus be corrected at the same time with a correction of a vertical deviation (hyper- or hypotropia); cyclodeviations without any vertical deviation can be difficult to manage surgically, as the correction of the cyclodeviation may introduce a vertical deviation.
