= Esotropia =

Form of strabismus in which the eyes turn inward

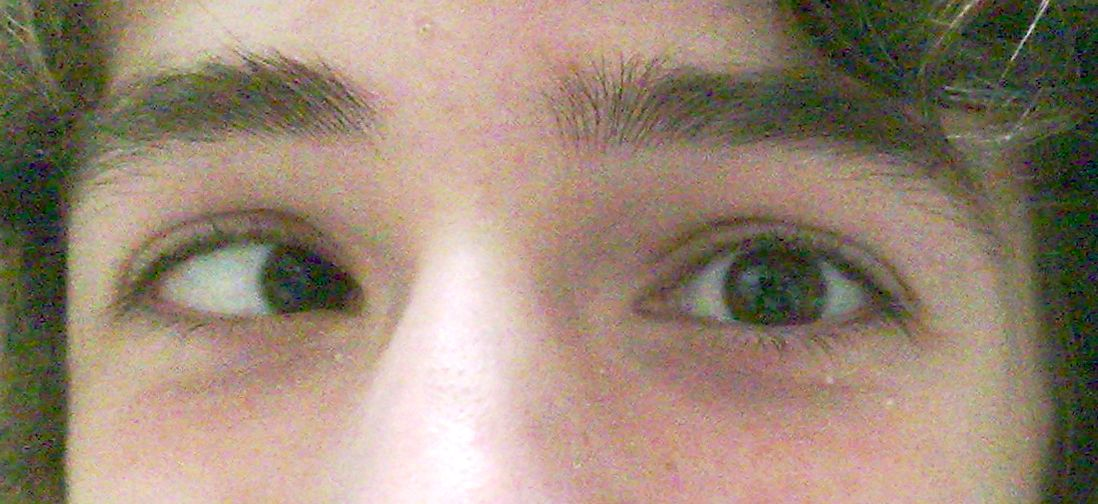
- Specialty: Ophthalmology

Esotropia (aka ET) (from Greek eso 'inward' and trope 'a turning') is a form of strabismus in which one or both eyes turn inward. The condition can be constantly present, or occur intermittently, and can give the affected individual a "cross-eyed" appearance. It is the opposite of exotropia and usually involves more severe axis deviation than esophoria. Esotropia is sometimes erroneously called "lazy eye", which describes the condition of amblyopia; a reduction in vision of one or both eyes that is not the result of any pathology of the eye and cannot be resolved by the use of corrective lenses. Amblyopia can, however, arise as a result of esotropia occurring in childhood: In order to relieve symptoms of diplopia or double vision, the child's brain will ignore or "suppress" the image from the esotropic eye, which when allowed to continue untreated will lead to the development of amblyopia. Treatment options for esotropia include glasses to correct refractive errors (see accommodative esotropia below), the use of prisms, orthoptic exercises, or eye muscle surgery.

== Types ==
=== Concomitant esotropia ===
Concomitant esotropia – that is, an inward squint that does not vary with the direction of gaze – mostly sets in before 12 months of age (this constitutes 40% of all strabismus cases) or at the age of three or four. Most patients with "early-onset" concomitant esotropia are emmetropic, whereas most of the "later-onset" patients are hyperopic. It is the most frequent type of natural strabismus not only in humans, but also in monkeys.

Concomitant esotropia can itself be subdivided into esotropias that are either constant, or intermittent.

Constant esotropia
A constant esotropia, as the name implies, is present all the time.
Intermittent esotropia
Intermittent esotropias (aka E(T)), again as the name implies, are not always present. In very rare cases, they may only occur in repeated cycles of 'one day on, one day off' (Cyclic Esotropia). However, the vast majority of intermittent esotropias are accommodative in origin.

A patient can have a constant esotropia for reading, but an intermittent esotropia for distance (but rarely vice versa).

=== Accommodative esotropia ===
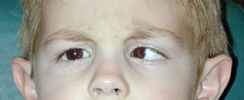
Child exhibiting uncorrected accommodative esotropia

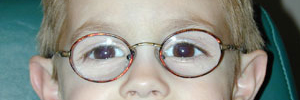
Child exhibiting corrected accommodative esotropia

Accommodative esotropia (also called refractive esotropia) is an inward turning of the eyes due to efforts of accommodation. It is often seen in patients with moderate amounts of hyperopia. The person with hyperopia, in an attempt to "accommodate" or focus the eyes, converges the eyes as well, as convergence is associated with activation of the accommodation reflex. The over-convergence associated with the extra accommodation required to overcome a hyperopic refractive error can precipitate a loss of binocular control and lead to the development of esotropia.

The chances of an esotropia developing in a hyperopic child will depend to some degree on the amount of hyperopia present. Where the degree of error is small, the child will typically be able to maintain control because the amount of over-accommodation required to produce clear vision is also small. Where the degree of hyperopia is large, the child may not be able to produce clear vision no matter how much extra-accommodation is exerted and thus no incentive exists for the over-accommodation and convergence that can give rise to the onset of esotropia. However, where the degree of error is small enough to allow the child to generate clear vision by over-accommodation, but large enough to disrupt their binocular control, esotropia will result.

Only about 20% of children with hyperopia greater than +3.5 diopters develop strabismus.

Where the esotropia is solely a consequence of uncorrected hyperopic refractive error, providing the child with the correct glasses and ensuring that these are worn all the time, is often enough to control the deviation. In such cases, known as 'fully accommodative esotropias', the esotropia will only be seen when the child removes their glasses. Many adults with childhood esotropias of this type make use of contact lenses to control their 'squint'. Some undergo refractive surgery for this purpose.

A second type of accommodative esotropia also exists, known as 'convergence excess esotropia'. In this condition the child exerts excessive accommodative convergence relative to their accommodation. Thus, in such cases, even when all underlying hyperopic refractive errors have been corrected, the child will continue to squint when looking at very small objects or reading small print. Even though they are exerting a normal amount of accommodative or 'focusing' effort, the amount of convergence associated with this effort is excessive, thus giving rise to esotropia. In such cases an additional hyperopic correction is often prescribed in the form of bifocal lenses, to reduce the degree of accommodation, and hence convergence, being exerted. Many children will gradually learn to control their esotropias, sometimes with the help of orthoptic exercises. However, others will eventually require extra-ocular muscle surgery to resolve their problems.

=== Congenital esotropia ===
Congenital esotropia, or infantile esotropia, is a specific sub-type of primary concomitant esotropia. It is a constant esotropia of large and consistent size with onset between birth and six months of age. It is not associated with hyperopia, so the exertion of accommodative effort will not significantly affect the angle of deviation. It is, however, associated with other ocular dysfunctions including oblique muscle over-actions, dissociated vertical deviation (DVD), manifest latent nystagmus, and defective abduction, which develops as a consequence of the tendency of those with infantile esotropia to 'cross fixate'. Cross fixation involves the use of the right eye to look to the left and the left eye to look to the right; a visual pattern that will be 'natural' for the person with the large angle esotropia whose eye is already deviated towards the opposing side.

The origin of the condition is unknown, and its early onset means that the affected individual's potential for developing binocular vision is limited. The appropriate treatment approach remains a matter of some debate. Some ophthalmologists favour an early surgical approach as offering the best prospect of binocularity whilst others remain unconvinced that the prospects of achieving this result are good enough to justify the increased complexity and risk associated with operating on those under the age of one year.

=== Incomitant esotropia ===
Incomitant esotropias are conditions in which the esotropia varies in size with direction of gaze. They can occur in both childhood and adulthood, and arise as a result of neurological, mechanical or myogenic problems. These problems may directly affect the extra-ocular muscles themselves, and may also result from conditions affecting the nerve or blood supply to these muscles or the bony orbital structures surrounding them. Examples of conditions giving rise to an esotropia might include a sixth cranial nerve (or abducens nerve) palsy, Duane's syndrome or orbital injury.

== Diagnosis ==
=== Classification ===
==== Right, left or alternating ====
Someone with esotropia will squint with either the right or the left eye but never with both eyes simultaneously. In a left esotropia, the left eye 'squints', and in a right esotropia the right eye 'squints'. In an alternating esotropia, the patient is able to alternate fixation between their right and left eye so that at one moment the right eye fixates and the left eye turns inward, and at the next the left eye fixates and the right turns inward. This alteration between the left and right eye is mostly spontaneous, but may be voluntary in some cases. Where a patient tends to consistently fixate with one eye and squint with the other, the eye that squints is likely to develop some amblyopia. Someone whose squint alternates is very unlikely to develop amblyopia because both eyes will receive equal visual stimulation. It is possible to encourage alternation through the use of occlusion or patching of the 'dominant' or 'fixating' eye to promote the use of the other. Esotropia is a highly prevalent congenital condition.

==== Concomitant versus incomitant ====
Esotropias can be concomitant, where the size of the deviation does not vary with direction of gaze, or incomitant, where the direction of gaze does affect the size, or indeed presence, of the esotropia. The majority of esotropias are concomitant and begin early in childhood, typically between the ages of 2 and 4 years. Incomitant esotropias occur both in childhood and adulthood as a result of neurological, mechanical or myogenic problems affecting the muscles controlling eye movements.

==== Primary, secondary or consecutive ====
Concomitant esotropias can arise as an initial problem, in which case they are designated as "primary", as a consequence of loss or impairment of vision, in which case they are designated as "secondary", or following overcorrection of an initial exotropia in which case they are described as being "consecutive". The vast majority of esotropias are primary.

== Treatment ==
The prognosis for each patient with esotropia will depend upon the origin and classification of their condition. However, in general, management will take the following course:

1. Identify and treat any underlying systemic condition.
2. Prescribe any glasses required and allow the patient time to 'settle into' them.
3. Use occlusion to treat any amblyopia present and encourage alternation.
4. Where appropriate, orthoptic exercises (sometimes referred to as vision therapy) can be used to attempt to restore binocularity.
5. Where appropriate, prismatic correction can be used, either temporarily or permanently, to relieve symptoms of double vision.
6. In specific cases, and primarily in adult patients, botulinum toxin can be used either as a permanent therapeutic approach, or as a temporary measure to prevent contracture of muscles prior to surgery
7. Where necessary, extra-ocular muscle surgery, like strabismus surgery, which is a surgery where the doctors physically move the muscle that is making the eye contract. This can be undertaken to improve cosmesis and, on occasion, restore binocularity.

== Etymology ==
The term "esotropia" is ultimately derived from the Ancient Greek ἔσω ésō, meaning "within", and τρόπος trópos, meaning "a turn".
