= Exotropia =

Visual disorder where eyes work independently

- Other names: Divergent squint, wall eyes
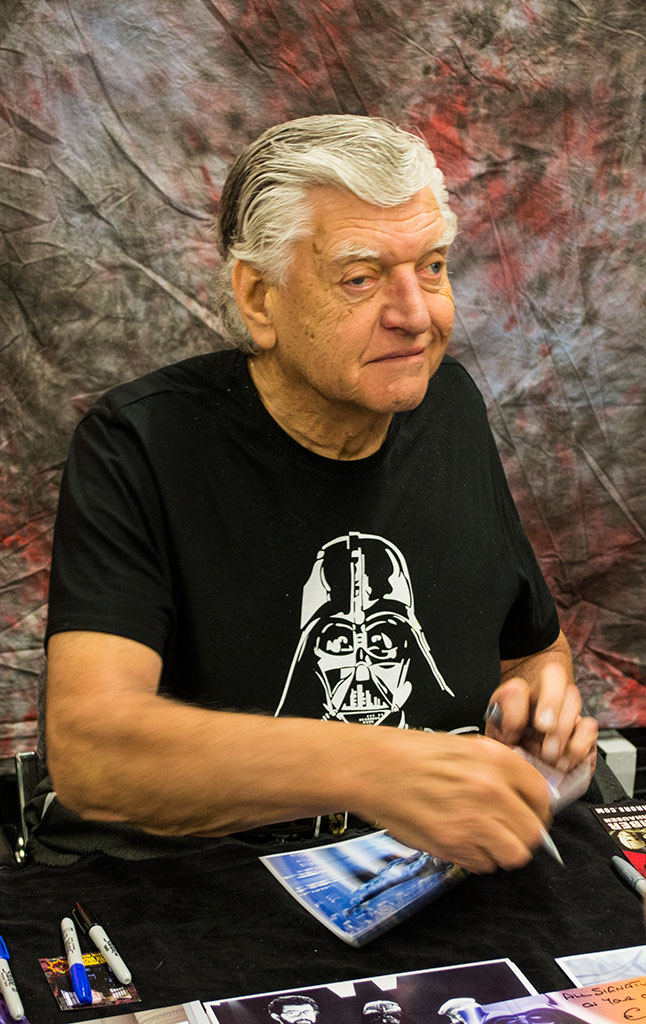
- David Prowse displaying exotropia of both eyes
- Specialty: Ophthalmology

Exotropia is a form of strabismus where one or both eyes are deviated outward. It is the opposite of esotropia and usually involves more severe axis deviation than exophoria. People with exotropia often experience crossed diplopia. Intermittent exotropia is a fairly common condition. "Sensory exotropia" occurs in the presence of poor vision in one eye. Infantile exotropia (sometimes called "congenital exotropia") is seen during the first year of life, and is less common than "essential exotropia" which usually becomes apparent several years later.

The brain's ability to see three-dimensional objects depends on proper alignment of the eyes. When both eyes are properly aligned and aimed at the same target, the visual portion of the brain fuses the two forms from the two eyes into a single image. When one eye turns inward, outward, upward, or downward, two different pictures are sent to the brain. Thus, the brain can no longer fuse the two images coming from the two eyes. This causes loss of depth perception and binocular vision. The term is from Greek exo meaning "outward" and trope meaning "a turning".

== Signs and symptoms ==
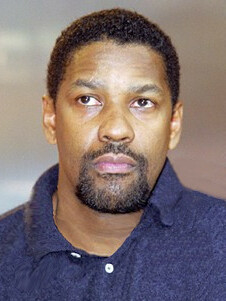
Denzel Washington is one of a number of celebrities with exotropia

The earliest sign of exotropia is usually a noticeable outward deviation of the eye. This sign may at first be intermittent, occurring when a child is daydreaming, not feeling well, or tired. It may also be more noticeable when the child looks at something in the distance. Squinting or frequent rubbing of the eyes is also common with exotropia. The child probably will not mention seeing double, i.e., double vision or diplopia. However, he or she may close one eye to compensate for the problem. In children, the reason for not seeing double is that the brain may ignore the image it receives from the squinting eye. This shutting down is known as 'suppression'.

Generally, exotropia progresses in frequency and duration. As the disorder progresses, the eyes start to turn out when looking at close objects as well as those in the distance. If left untreated, the eye may turn out continually, causing a loss of binocular vision or stereopsis.

In young children with any form of strabismus, the brain may learn to ignore the misaligned eye's image and see only the image from the best-seeing eye. This is called amblyopia, or lazy eye, and results in a loss of binocular vision, impairing depth perception. In adults who develop strabismus, double vision sometimes occurs because the brain has already been trained to receive images from both eyes and cannot ignore the image from the turned eye.

Additionally in adults who have had exotropia since childhood, the brain may adapt to using a "blind-spot", whereby it receives images from both eyes, but no full image from the deviating eye, thus avoiding double vision, and in fact, increasing peripheral vision on the side of the deviating eye.

According to a study published in the American Journal of Ophthalmology, over 90 percent of children with intermittent exotropia become nearsighted by the time they reach 20.

== Causes ==
The causes of exotropia are not fully understood. Six muscles control eye movement, four that move the eye up and down and two that move it left and right. All these muscles must be coordinated and working properly for the brain to see a single image. When one or more of these muscles does not work properly, some form of strabismus may occur. Strabismus is more common in children with disorders that affect the brain such as cerebral palsy, Down syndrome, hydrocephalus, and brain tumors. One study has found that children with exotropia are three times more likely to develop a psychiatric disorder in comparison with the general population.

== Treatment ==
A comprehensive eye examination including an ocular motility (i.e., eye movement) evaluation and an evaluation of the internal ocular structures allows an eye doctor to accurately diagnose exotropia. Although glasses and/or patching therapy, exercises, or prisms may reduce or help control the outward-turning eye in some children, surgery is often required.

A common form of exotropia is known as "convergence insufficiency" that responds well to orthoptic vision therapy including exercises. This disorder is characterized by an inability of the eyes to work together when used for near viewing, such as reading. Instead of the eyes focusing together on the near object, one deviates outward.

Consecutive exotropia arises after an initial esotropia. Most often it results from surgical overcorrection of the initial esotropia. It can be addressed with further surgery or with vision therapy; vision therapy has shown promising results if the consecutive exotropia is intermittent, alternating, and of small magnitude. (Consecutive exotropia may however also spontaneously develop from esotropia, without surgery or botulinum toxin treatment.)

Because of the risks of surgery, and because about 35% of people require at least one more surgery, many people try vision therapy first. This consists of visual exercises.

Strabismus surgery is sometimes recommended if the exotropia is present for more than half of each day or if the frequency is increasing over time. It is also indicated if a child has significant exotropia when reading or viewing near objects or if evidence shows that the eyes are losing their ability to work as a single unit (binocular vision). Finally, if there is a complaint of headaches, and no other cause for the headaches can be found, then these headaches could be because the child or adult is trying to control the exotropia. If none of these criteria are met, surgery may be postponed pending simple observation with or without some form of eyeglass and/or patching therapy. In very mild cases, a chance exists that the exotropia will diminish with time. The long-term success of surgical treatment for conditions such as intermittent exotropia is not well proven, and surgery can often result in a worsening of symptoms due to overcorrection. Evidence from systematic reviews of interventions show clinical benefits for patching for children ages 12 months to ten years. There was insufficient evidence related to the benefits conferred by surgical interventions.

The surgical procedure for the correction of exotropia involves making a small incision in the tissue covering the eye to reach the eye muscles. The appropriate muscles are then repositioned to allow the eye to move properly. The procedure is usually done under general anaesthesia. Recovery time is rapid, and most people are able to resume normal activities within a few days. Following surgery, corrective eyeglasses may be needed, and in many cases, further surgery is required later to keep the eyes straight.

When a child requires surgery, the procedure is usually performed before the child attains school age. This is easier for the child and gives the eyes a better chance to work together. As with all surgery, some risks occur. However, strabismus surgery is usually a safe and effective treatment.
