= Esophoria =

Inward turning of the eye

- Specialty: Ophthalmology

Esophoria is an eye condition involving inward deviation of the eye, usually due to extra-ocular muscle imbalance. It is a type of heterophoria.

== Cause ==
Causes include:

- Refractive errors
- Divergence insufficiency
- Convergence excess; this can be due to nerve, muscle, congenital or mechanical anomalies.

Unlike esotropia, fusion is possible and therefore diplopia is uncommon.
