= Exophoria =

- Specialty: Ophthalmology

Exophoria is a form of heterophoria in which there is a tendency of the eyes to deviate outward. During examination, when the eyes are dissociated, the visual axes will appear to diverge away from one another.

The axis deviation in exophoria is usually mild compared with that of exotropia.

== Cause ==
Exophoria can be caused by several factors, which include:

- Refractive errors – distance and near deviation approximately equal.
- Divergence excess - exodeviation is more than 15 dioptres greater for distance than near deviation.
- Convergence insufficiency – near exodeviation greater than distance deviation.

These can be due to nerve, muscle, or congenital problems, or due to mechanical anomalies. Unlike exotropia, fusion is possible in this condition, causing diplopia to be uncommon.

== Prevalence ==
Exophoria is common in infancy and childhood, and increases with age.
