= Worth 4 dot test =

Clinical test for binocular vision

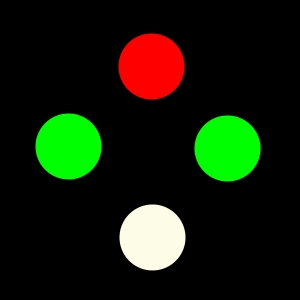
- Worth Four Light Test
- Synonyms: W4LT
- Purpose: assess degree of binocular vision

The Worth Four Light Test, also known as the Worth's four dot test or W4LT, is a clinical test mainly used for assessing a patient's degree of binocular vision and binocular single vision. Binocular vision involves an image being projected by each eye simultaneously into an area in space and being fused into a single image. The Worth Four Light Test is also used in detection of suppression of either the right or left eye. Suppression occurs during binocular vision when the brain does not process the information received from either of the eyes. This is a common adaptation to strabismus, amblyopia and aniseikonia.

The W4LT can be performed by the examiner at two distances, at near (at 33 cm from the patient) and at far (at 6 m from the patient). At both testing distances the patient is required to wear red-green goggles (with one red lens over one eye, usually the right, and one green lens over the left) When performing the test at far (distance) the W4LT instrument is composed of a silver box (mounted on the wall in front of the patient), which has four lights inside it. The lights are arranged in a diamond formation, with a red light at the top, two green lights at either side (left and right) and a white light at the bottom. When performing the test at near (at 33 cm ) the lights are arranged in exactly the same manner (diamond formation), with the difference being that at near, the lights are located in a hand-held instrument which is similar to a light torch.

Because the red filter blocks the green light and the green filter blocks the red light, it is possible to determine if the patient is using both eyes simultaneously and in a coordinated manner. With both eyes open, a patient with normal binocular vision will appreciate four lights. If the patient either closes or suppresses an eye they will see either two or three lights. If the patient does not fuse the images of the two eyes, they will see five lights (diplopia).

== Indications for use ==
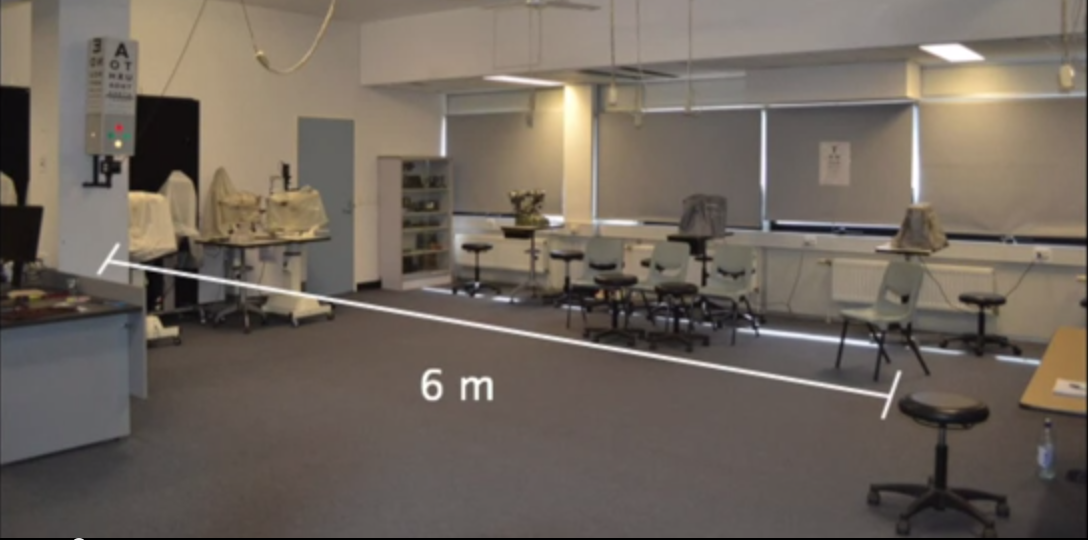
The Worth Four Light Test at a distance of 6 meters

The Worth Four Light Test is indicated for use when assessing the binocular functions, the ability of eyes to work in coordination, of an individual. It can be used to develop a diagnosis or to support or confirm an initial diagnosis. It can be used when wanting to assess whether the individual has a normal or abnormal binocular single vision response (BSV). It can be used to establish whether a patient has the ability for the eyes to fuse the light that is received from each eye into 4 lights. The test is indicated with the use of a presence of a prism in individuals with a strabismus and fusion is considered present if 4 lights are maintained, with or without the use of a prism. The W4LT can also be indicated when aiding a person to develop and strengthen their fusional capacities.

If the images are unable to be fused the W4LT is still indicated to help to determine if an individual appreciates diplopia (double vision) or are suppressing an image from one eye. In cases of manifest strabismus the test can help in determining the nature and type of the diplopia or which eye is suppressing. Therefore, is indicated in cases of a suspected central suppression scotoma as it can be used to detect where the lights may not be appreciated from the eye with the scotoma though in some cases of minimal deviation in the eye as demonstrated in a microtropic deviation a normal response of 4 lights may be reported. Though it can be used in these patients to prove the presence of peripheral fusion and that they have bi-foveal fixation.

Other indications for the test include establishing an individual's dominant eye dominant eye compared to the other and when evaluating reduced monocular visual acuity which shows no improve on pinhole testing.

Whilst there are no contraindications of the W4LT there needs to be caution in interpreting the results of individuals with BSV in natural conditions as they may show a diplopic response under the dissociation of the test. Also in individuals who have abnormal retinal correspondence (ARC) they may provide an unexpected response, and those who have misaligned visual axis whom in natural conditions suppress may actually provide a diplopic response upon testing.

== Method of assessment ==
The Worth Four Light Test is relatively simple to undertake. First one must place the red/green goggles over the patients eyes, with the red goggle traditionally placed over the right eye.

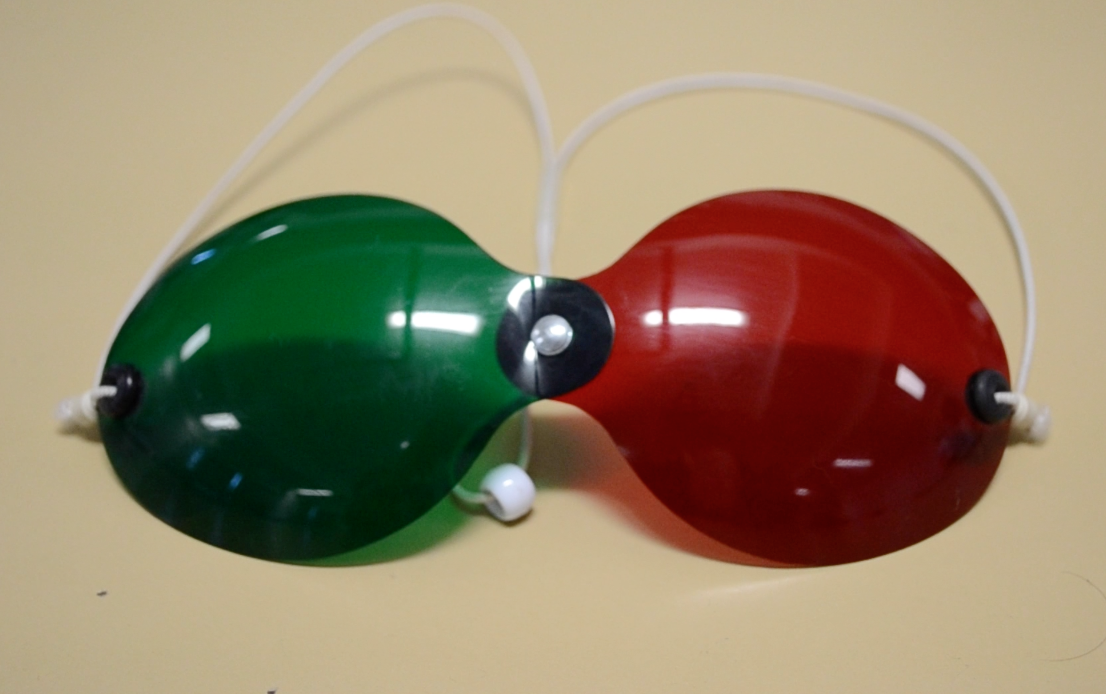
Red Green Goggles used in the Worth Four Light Test

Next one must dim the room lighting. This allows the patient to see the lights better.

For a distance measurement, one should have the patient set up six metres away from the light source. For a near measurement, the test should be performed at approximately one third of a metre, or thirty three centimetres, with a handheld Worth's Four Lights torch.

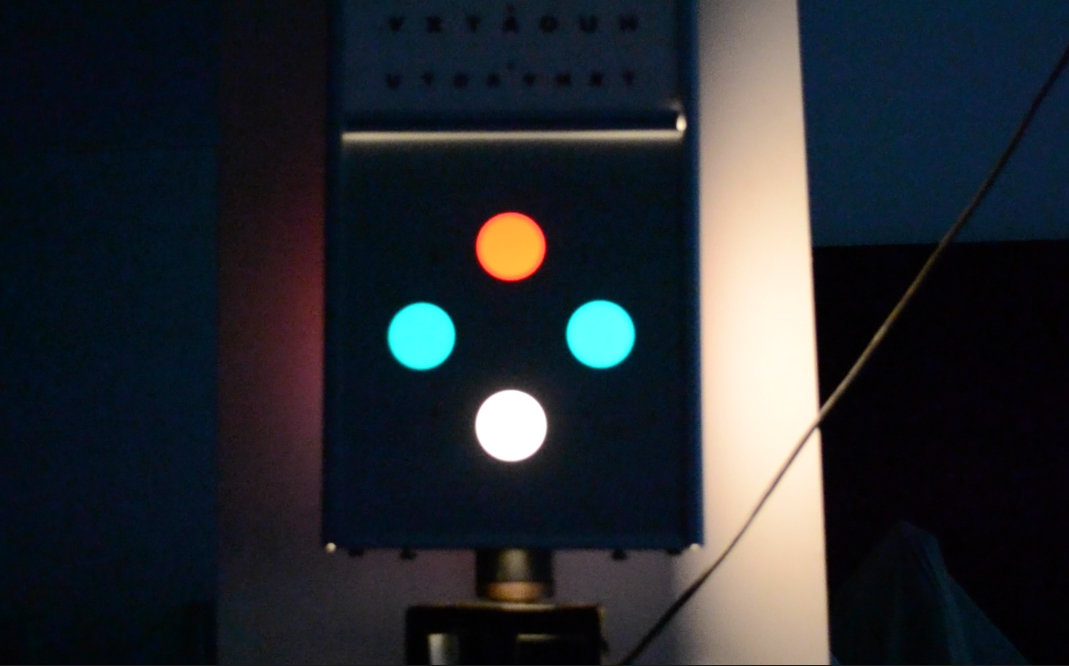
The Worth Four Light Test in dimmed lighting conditions

Then, ask the patient what they see. They should respond with "I see … number of lights" provided they have understood what one has asked them. Ask them to describe the lights and ask about the colour of the lights. If they see five lights, ask whether the green dots are higher or lower than the red dots. Ask about the positioning of the dots: for example, are the red dots to the left or the right of the green dots. Also ask if the dots are flashing on and off or switching between red and green.

This series of questions is essential in order to ensure that one correctly records exactly what the patient is seeing, so that the clinician can interpret the patient's results and then make an accurate diagnosis.

== Recording and interpreting outcomes ==
When recording results for the W4LT it is important to ask the patient a series of questions in order to ensure one correctly records exactly what they are seeing. This is essential in order to interpret the patient's results and then make an accurate diagnosis. The questions are:

1. How many lights is the patient seeing?
2. What colour are they? Where are they located?
3. Are all the lights in line? Or are some higher than the others?
4. Do all the lights show up at one time, or are they flashing on and off?

When recording results it is important to indicate the test used, a description of the lights seen and an indication of what the result means. It is also important to note the distance at which the test was conducted and whether or not the patient wore their own refractive correction.

Where communication is difficult between clinician and patient, such as in the presence of a language barrier, or when working with a child, it may be a good idea to get the patient to draw what they are seeing. The clinician can then interpret the results from the image.

=== Results ===
There are a number of possible results demonstrated by a W4LT

==== Normal retinal correspondence ====
In the absence of a deviation, the patient will see the lights exactly as they appear. When questioned they will report that:

- They see 4 lights, 1 red, 2 green and one mixed colour
- The two green lights will be to either side with the red light slightly above them and the mixed coloured light below the red

This is recorded as : W4LT (D): 4 lights (BSV)

==== Abnormal retinal correspondence ====
It will be demonstrated on cover test that the patient has a manifest deviation. When questioned about the lights the patient will give a normal response and will see the lights exactly as they appear. They will report that:

- They see 4 lights, 1 red, 2 green and one mixed colour
- The two green lights will be to either side with the red light slightly above them and the mixed coloured light below the red

This is recorded as : W4LT (D): 4 lights (ARC)

NB: ARC can only be confirmed in conjunction with additional clinical tests for retinal correspondence. The patient must demonstrate a manifest deviation on cover test. Despite their apparent deviation, when tested with the W4LT they will produce a normal BSV result, indicating the presence of Abnormal Retinal Correspondence.

==== Esotropia ====
In an Esotropic (ET) deviation, the patient will experience uncrossed diplopia. When questioned about the position of the lights, they will report that:

- They see 5 lights, 2 red and 3 green
- The lights are horizontally displaced, seen side by side
- The 2 red lights from the right eye are seen on the right side
- The 3 green lights from the left eye are seen on the left side

This is recorded as: W4LT (D): 5 lights (Uncrossed Diplopia) ET

NB: The clinician will be unable to indicate which eye is the deviating eye based on these results alone. The results should be interpreted with other clinical findings in order to produce a final diagnosis.

==== Exotropia ====
In an Exotropic (XT) deviation, the patient will experience crossed diplopia.

When questioned about the position of the lights, they will report that:

- They see 5 lights, 2 Red and 3 Green
- The lights are horizontally displaced, and are seen side by side
- The 2 Red Lights from the Right eye are on the left side
- The 3 Green lights from the Left eye are on the right side

This is recorded as: W4LT (D): 5 lights (Crossed Diplopia) XT

NB: The clinician will be unable to indicate which eye is the deviating eye based on these results alone. The results should be interpreted with other clinical findings in order to produce a final diagnosis.

==== Hypotropia or hypertropia ====
In cases of vertical deviations, patients will report that:

- They see 5 lights: 2 red and 3 green
- The lights are vertically displaced in relation to one another
- The green lights (left eye) are on top of the red lights (right eye),

which is interpreted as : R HT or LHypoT

- The red lights (right eye) are on top of the green lights (left eye),

which is interpreted as: RHypoT or L H T

This is recorded as: W4LT (D): 5 lights (vertical diplopia)

The clinician can relate the position of the lights directly back to the deviation and height of the eye (i.e.) the higher lights belong to the lower eye, and the lower lights belong to the higher eye.

NB: If the lights are not situated directly above one another, but are also separated horizontally, it is normally indicative of a mixed deviation where there is a horizontal, as well as vertical strabismus present.

==== Suppression ====
In cases of manifest strabismus, it is not always expected that the patient will experience diplopia.

Suppression is indicated when the patient reports that:

- They see only the 3 Green lights from the Left eye

Which is interpreted as R Suppression

- They see only the 2 Red lights from the Right eye

Which is interpreted as L Suppression

- They see 2 Red lights OR 3 Green lights

All 5 lights are never present at the same time, but the patient is switching between the two responses. This result is interpreted as Alternating Suppression

This can be recorded as:

W4LT (D): 3 Lights (R Supp.)

W4LT (D): 2 Lights (L Supp.)

W4LT (D): 2 or 3 Lights (Alt. Supp.)

== Advantages and disadvantages ==
Advantages

- Can be quick and simple to perform in the clinic as the test is easy to orientate and the red green goggles are simply put over the eyes. There is no turning of lenses, as in Bagolini Striated Glasses Test which is another test measuring binocular functions, making the interpretation of the results less complicated
- There are no large glasses frames such as in the Bagolini striated glasses test so the goggles are minimally obstructive to the patient's vision
- Refractive correction can be worn under the goggles
- Good starting point when investigating the nature of diplopia i.e. to find manifest, intermittent, crossed or uncrossed diplopia
- It is less dissociative than a cover test
- Can be used to determine if a patient will demonstrate binocular single vision with corrective prism or head posture
- Relatively easy to record and interpret the results

Disadvantages

- Subjective in nature and relies on patient responses
- The patient must have fusion and stereopsis to get accurate results
- It is a highly dissociative test resulting in responses being less relevant to what the patient sees in their normal daily environment, as the environment would normally be different
1. A. Lights need to be off or dimmed in order to see the dots / lights
1. B. There is no common colour to fuse
1. C. Dark filters in the goggles are used and are less like natural conditions and therefore less relevant to what the patient sees in their normal daily environment
- People with Red/green colour blindness cannot accurately perform the test as the colours used on the test are red and green
- The test results are only useful in combination with other testing and results and not on their own
- If performing the test twice, for example at near and at distance, the patient (especially children) may remember their previous answer and simply give the same answer from the last test, providing inaccurate results

== See also ==
- Eye examination
- Diplopia
- Strabismus
