= Four prism dioptre reflex test =

Test of eye alignment

- Purpose: assess alignment of both eyes

The Four Prism Dioptre Reflex Test (also known as the 4 PRT, or 4 Prism Dioptre Base-out Test) is an objective, non-dissociative test used to prove the alignment of both eyes (i.e. the presence of binocular single vision) by assessing motor fusion. Through the use of a 4 dioptre base out prism, diplopia is induced which is the driving force for the eyes to change fixation and therefore regain bifoveal fixation meaning, they overcome that amount of power.

== Indications for use ==
This test is performed on patients suspected to have small angle deviations of less than 10 prism dioptres, a microtropia, that may or may not have been observed on cover test because of subtle eye movements. The test determines whether the patient has bifoveal fixation or monofixation despite their eyes seeming straight.
On the cover component of cover test a small manifest deviation may be documented, however the patient passes the Worth's Four Lights Test or Bagolini Striated Glasses Test, indicating binocular single vision, but fails a bifoveal test such as the Lang I/II.
The 4 PRT therefore confirms the presence of a microtropia whether it be with identity (i.e. with eccentric viewing) or without identity (i.e. extension of Panum's fusion area).

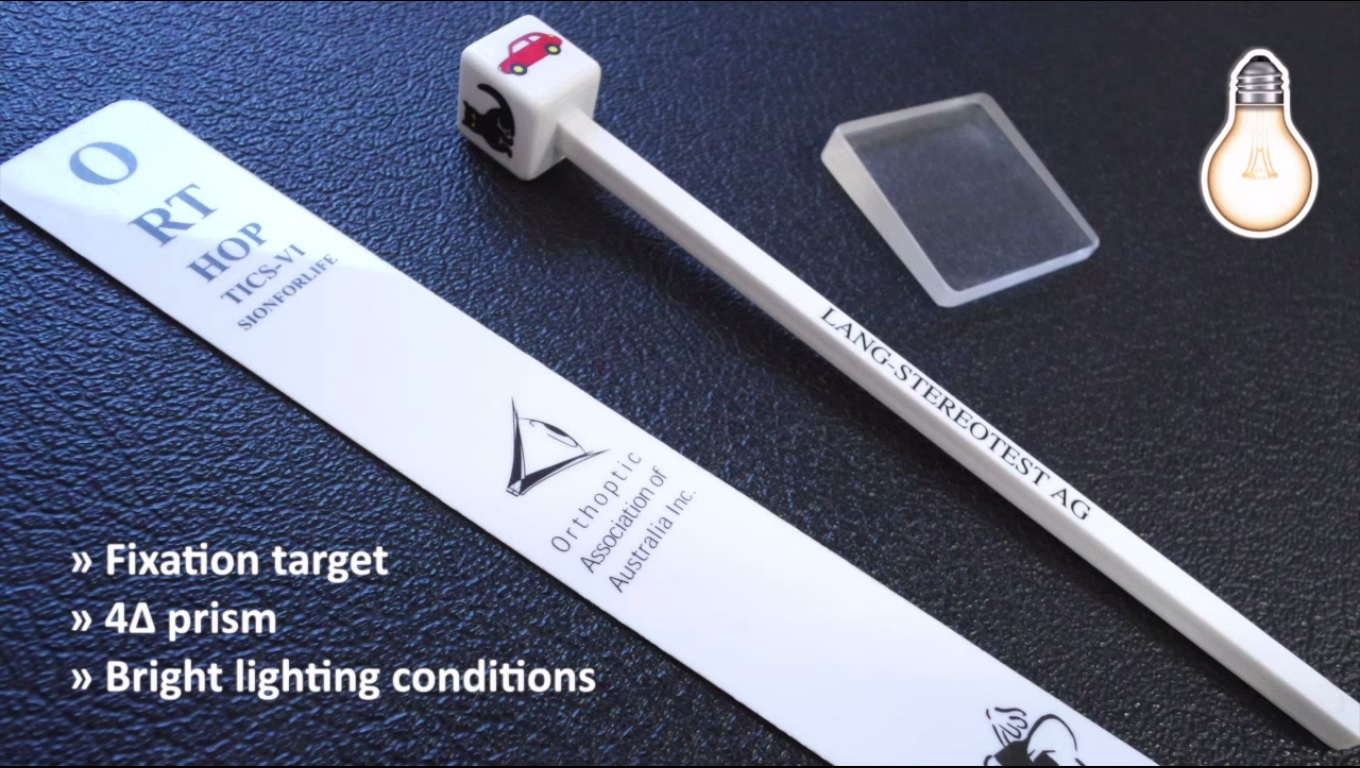
4PRT Equipment

== Equipment ==
- Fixation target, does not have to be accommodative
- 4 dioptre prism, either loose or prism bar
- Bright lighting conditions

== Method of assessment ==
As it is an objective test, few instructions are required to be given to the patient. The patient is asked to fixate on a target while the examiner places a 4 prism dioptre base-out prism over the patient's eye, observing the response of the fellow eye.

The target is a single isolated distance target of approximately 1-2 lines larger than the best corrected acuity at distance. It is performed with the prism placed over the right eye, then the left eye. Four-base-out is performed at distance only, because suppression scotomas in micro-strabismus are usually small and by using a near target, the examiner might cause the image of the target to land outside of the suppressed area and any signs of micro-strabismus or monofixation might be masked.

== Interpretation of results/ recording ==
=== Normal response ===
If the patient's eyes are aligned and is bifoveal, the shifting of the image caused by the prism will produce a movement towards the apex of the prism (of the eye under the prism), and the fellow eye will have an outward movement in the same direction of the same magnitude due to Hering's law of equal innervation. Simultaneously the fellow eye produces a fusional convergence movement as there is no central suppression of that fellow eye. This is a result of overcoming the diplopia experienced.

=== Abnormal response: central suppression ===
In cases where the patient has central suppression the following will occur.When the prism is placed in front of the non-deviating eye, both eye will produce a conjugate movement in the direction of the prism apex. However unlike a normal response, the fellow deviated eye will not make a corrective movement because diplopia has not been appreciated since the image will fall into the suppression scotoma.

Whereas when the prism is placed in front of the deviated eye, the image instantly falls into the suppression scotoma, diplopia is not detected. This causes the eye under the prism to remain stationary, therefore the fellow eye does not make a conjugate movement.

=== Abnormal response: eccentric fixation ===
Eccentric fixation is less common but nonetheless a possible reason as to why a patient may fail the 4 PRT. Anisometropia in a patient can lead to a microtropia. If left untreated at a young age foveal suppression occurs and the eccentric area of the deviated eye replaces foveal fixation for both binocular and monocular vision. This occurs with the interest of finding better visual acuity, however all patients found with eccentric fixation have amblyopia, suppression, anisometropia and poorer stereopsis. Eccentric fixation utilises an abnormal retinal correspondence point and not the fovea, no movement under the prism is seen when placed over the deviated eye as the image falls onto the suppression scotoma.

=== Abnormal response: extension of Panum's fusional area ===
When the prism is placed in front of the non-deviating eye, the eye under the prism will move in and the fellow eye move out in the same way discussed above due to Herring's law. However similarly to the response given by a patient with central suppression, the fellow eye will not make a fusional convergence movement back in as the image remains in the extended Panum's fusional area. Diplopia is not appreciated in this instance.

The extension of Panum's fusion area can be interpreted as a shift in the mean locus of the fusion range whereby one of the two corresponding points of the retina is extended.

=== Recording examples ===
4 PRT: BSV

- 4∆ PRT: sc (N) –ve for R micro
- 4∆ PRT: sc (N) BSV

4 PRT: Microtropia

- 4∆ PRT: sc (F) R suppression

== Advantages and disadvantages ==
Advantages	Disadvantages
Objective test; Quick and easy to perform; Can be used on adults and cooperative children; Used to assess binocular functions; Can confirm presence of microtropia; Proves the presence or absence of normal (bifoveal) binocular single vision - thereby revealing if there is a central or paracentral suppression scotoma; The prism can be mounted in a frame with a handle attached; Test can be performed at any fixation distance - near or far; Results of the test can be checked/confirmed using Bagolini glasses, W4LT (macular torch) or Synoptophore; Post-strabismus surgery aim at times, can use in post-op review	When measuring the suppression scotoma, it needs to be done on cooperative patients; Suppression scotoma measurement is a time consuming process which requires accurate observation and the methods described can rarely be used with children.; Can only pick up small angle strabismus of 10pd or less therefore possible misdiagnosis if microtropia is less than 4 diopters
