= Bagolini Striated Glasses Test =

Subjective clinical test for binocular functions

- Purpose: extent of binocular functions

The Bagolini striated glasses test, or BSGT, is a subjective clinical test to detect the presence or extent of binocular functions and is generally performed by an optometrist or orthoptist or ophthalmologist (medical/surgical eye doctor). It is mainly used in strabismus clinics. Through this test, suppression, microtropia, diplopia and manifest deviations can be noted. However this test should always be used in conjunction with other clinical tests, such as Worth 4 dot test, Cover test, Prism cover test and Maddox rod to come to a diagnosis.

== Equipment ==
To perform the test you will need

- Bagolini Striated Glasses
- Pen torch or a distant light source.

Alternatively, trial frames and lenses or a lorgnette can be used. In some cases, the use of prisms is necessary to measure a deviation and test for the presence of binocular functions.

== Principles ==
Apart from testing binocular functions, Bagolini striated glasses can measure cyclotropia . The principle of the test is similar to that of double Maddox rod test. The glasses are placed in the trial frames with the striations vertical, giving rise to two horizontal line images when viewing a spotlight. If the patient has a vertical deviation, the lines will be seen one above the other. If there is little or no vertical separation, vertical prism can be used to separate the lines. The patient is asked if one or both lines are tilted. The lines can be straightened subjectively by rotating the glasses in the trial frame and the degree of cyclotropia recorded.

== Indications for use ==
A video covering the Bagolini Striated Test

The BSGT is used for patients with strabismus to test for suppression, normal retinal correspondence or abnormal retinal correspondence, particularly in cases of manifest strabismus.

The Bagolini Striated Glasses Test is the test most likely to allow the demonstration of fusion in patients who fuse intermittently. Harmonious anomalous retinal correspondence is found more frequently when using Bagolini Striated Glasses Test than with the Worth 4 dot test or the synoptophore.

== Method ==
The BSGT is performed under normal lighting conditions. The Bagolini glasses can either be used in trial frames or are set up in reversible lorgnette frames which are placed over the patients glasses who wear refractive correction. The examiner shines a torch light, directing it towards the centre bridge of the Bagolini glasses i.e. the patients nose (light is at patients eye level) from distance (6 m) or near (33 cm). The patient can also be tested in alternate positions of gaze (upgaze or downgaze). The test is usually performed at near.

The number and type of questions asked are contingent on whether the patient has binocularity present and the consequent responses to the testing questions. The patient is firstly asked about the number of lights visible and the position and number of lines seen.

The patient is asked to describe or draw what they have seen When asking the patient to describe what they see, the clinician can prompt them by asking:

- How many lights do you see
- How many lines do you see
- Do the lines cross
- Are the two lines seen at the same time
- Do the lines intersect through the light
- Do the lines have any gaps in them
- Which line is on the right/left (or which line is higher/lower)

== Recording ==
Results are recorded by drawing the cross as the patient sees it, alongside an interpretation of the results.

For example:

BSGT: X BSV

BSGT: / Left suppression

== Results ==
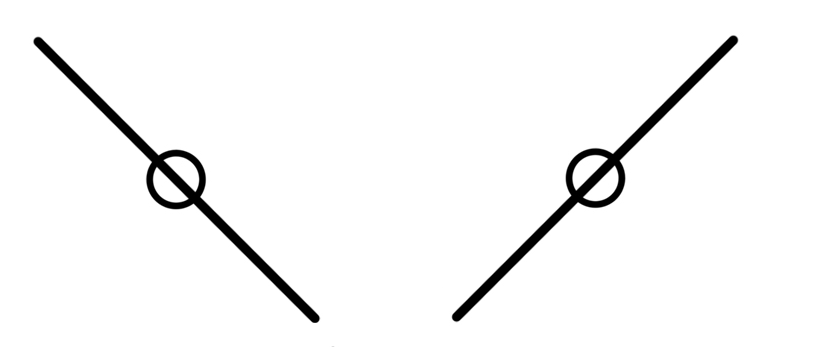
Suppression responses

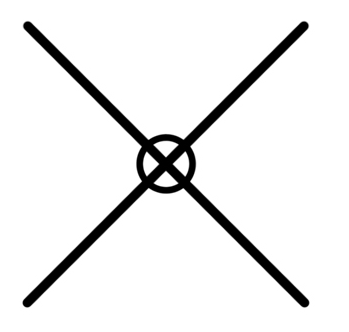
Binocular single vision response

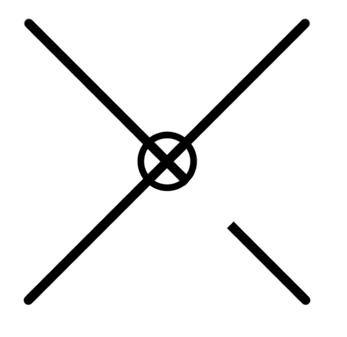
A possible microtropia response

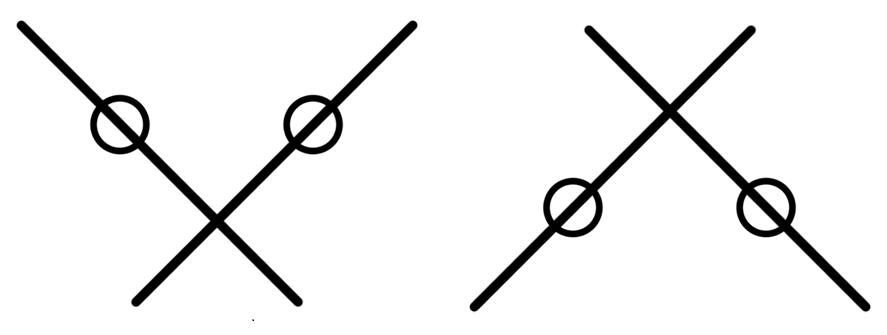
Possible manifest strabismus responses

When interpreting results, the line associated with each eye is the line perpendicular to the lens in front of that eye. If the lens in front of the right eye is at 135 degrees, then the line on the results representing the right eye will be at 45 degrees.

One light: If the patient sees one light, that means that either they have fused the two images from each eye together, or are suppressing of one of the images.

Two lights: If the patient sees two lights, this is indicative of diplopia as the patient has an image from each eye but is unable to fuse the two.

One line: If only one line is seen, this means one eye is suppressing. The eye that is suppressing is the eye which the corresponding line is not seen.

Two lines: If the patient sees two lines, this means that there is no suppression of either eye.

Disappearing line: The patient may report that they see one line, then the lines switch and they can only see the other line. This is the case in an alternating deviation, where there is always one eye suppressing, however the fixing eye is switching.

Broken line: If a line has a break in it, this means that there is a scotoma somewhere on the retina.

=== Normal binocular single vision (BSV) ===
In a patient with normal binocular functions, the expected results would be a cross with the light where the two lines intersect.

=== Microtropia ===
In a patient with microtropia, the patient may see one light and two lines, with one of the lines having a small break in it. This is due to foveal suppression.

=== Esotropia ===
In a patient with an unsuppressed esotropia, the patient will see two lights with one line through each light. The line corresponding to the right eye will be on the right side, meaning the images are uncrossed.

=== Exotropia ===
In a patient with an unsuppressed exotropia, the patient will see two lights with one line through each light. The line corresponding to the right eye will be on the left side of the results, meaning the images are crossed.

=== Hypertropia/Hypotropia ===
In a patient with an unsuppressed vertical deviation, one line will appear higher than the other. If the image of the right eye is higher than that of the left, this means the right eye is lower than the left. This could be either a right hypotropia or a left hypertropia.

=== Harmonious Abnormal retinal correspondence ===
If the patient has a known deviation, but they report a cross as seen in a patient with normal binocular functions, this indicates the presence of harmonious abnormal retinal correspondence.

=== Inharmonious Abnormal retinal correspondence ===
If the patient reports that they see two lines, however only one of these lines crosses through the fixation light, this indicates the presence of inharmonious abnormal retinal correspondence.

This test merely detects the presence of a deviation, but does not identify which eye is the deviated eye.

== Advantages and disadvantages ==
Advantages

- Because the BSGT is performed in well-lit conditions it has a lesser dissociative effect on the eyes, giving truer results than other tests such as the Worth 4 light test.

Disadvantages

- Extraneous light sources during testing can cause patient confusion.
- It is a subjective test, relying on the patients responses.
- Miscommunication between the clinician and patient may result in inaccuracies.
- The results can be misinterpreted if the clinician does not take note of the orientation of the striations.
- Extensive suppression may interfere with perception of the second stripe.

== See also ==
- Cover test – Examination to determine eye misalignment
- Diplopia – Double vision
- Eye examination – Series of tests assessing vision and pertaining to the eyes
- Maddox rod – Testing tool in optometry
- Prism cover test
- Retinal correspondence – Relationship between paired retinal visual cells in the eyes
- Strabismus – Eyes not aligning when looking at something
- Worth's four light test – Clinical test for binocular vision
