= Suppression (eye) =

Subconscious adaptation by the brain to eliminate symptoms of eye disorders

Suppression of an eye is a subconscious adaptation by a person's brain to eliminate the symptoms of disorders of binocular vision such as strabismus, convergence insufficiency and aniseikonia. The brain can eliminate double vision by ignoring all or part of the image of one of the eyes. The area of a person's visual field that is suppressed is called the suppression scotoma (with a scotoma meaning, more generally, an area of partial alteration in the visual field). Suppression can lead to amblyopia.

== Effect ==
Nobel-prize winner David H. Hubel described suppression in simple terms as follows:

"Suppression is familiar to anyone who has trained himself to look through a monocular microscope, sight a gun, or do any other strictly one-eye task, with the other eye open. The scene simply disappears for the suppressed eye."

Suppression is frequent in children with anisometropia or strabismus or both. For instance, children with infantile esotropia may alternate with which eye they look, each time suppressing vision in the other eye.

== Measurement ==
During an eye examination, the presence of suppression and the size and location of the suppression scotoma may be the Worth 4 dot test (a subjective test that is considered to be the most precise suppression test), or with other subjective tests such as the Bagolini striated lens test, or with objective tests such as the 4 prism base out test.

== Anti-suppression therapy ==
Suppression may treated with vision therapy, though there is a wide range of opinions on long-term effectiveness between eye care professionals.

== Age factors ==
Young children with strabismus normally suppress the visual field of one eye (or part of it), whereas adults who develop strabismus normally do not suppress and therefore suffer from double vision (diplopia). This also means that adults (and older children) have a higher risk of post-operative diplopia after undergoing strabismus surgery than young children. Patients who have undergone strabismus surgery at a young age often have monofixation syndrome (with peripheral binocular fusion and a central suppression scotoma).

== See also ==
- Amblyopia
- Bagolini Striated Glasses Test
- Diplopia
- Infantile esotropia
