= Horror fusionis =

- Specialty: Ophthalmology

In ophthalmology, horror fusionis is a condition in which the eyes have an unsteady deviation, with the extraocular muscles performing spasm-like movements that continuously shift the eyes away from the position in which they would be directed to the same point in space, giving rise to diplopia. Even when the double vision images are made to nearly overlap using optical means such as prisms, the irregular movements prevent binocular fusion. The name horror fusionis (Latin phrase literally meaning "fear of fusion") arises from the notion that the brain is, or at least appears to be, actively preventing binocular fusion.

The condition is an extreme type of binocular fusion deficiency.

== Symptoms and signs ==
When the eye position is fully corrected (for example after surgical alignment of the eyes) or when the patient is provided with the best achievable prism correction, the patient does not experience binocular fusion and, instead, sees a double image that is very close to the fixation image and is perceived as "dancing around" it. The eyes display an unsteady misalignment.

== Risk factors ==
Horror fusionis is a rare condition and normally appears only in patients who have been treated by means of surgery or other interventions. Attempts to achieve stereoscopic vision, in particular anti-suppression therapy and other orthoptic exercises, may lead to double vision as undesired side effect, in particular also to horror fusionis.

In terms of outcome of strabismus surgery, monofixation syndrome is considered a better outcome than horror fusionis.

== Diagnosis ==
Horror fusionis is diagnosed using a synoptophore: an image swept across the retina of the nonfixing eye at constant speed is perceived to change its speed in a specific way and then to "jump over" the fixation target.

The specification of horror fusionis is usually distinguished from a more general condition called central fusion disruption syndrome, where the patient is unable to fuse or to suppress.

== Management ==
Bielschowsky's original case was corrected by providing full optical correction to the underlying vision problem.

Generally speaking, if the double vision is intractable by optical and other means and the patient needs relief from the disturbing double images, it may be indicated to use a more modest approach that simply ensures that the image of the weaker eye no longer interferes with the image of the dominant eye. This relieves the most disturbing symptoms, albeit at the cost of offering only subnormal binocular vision.

Diplopia symptoms can be relieved by using spectacles that obscure or blur all or part of the view. This can be achieved for example by applying semi-opaque tape or clear nail polish to a large central portion of one side of a pair of spectacles or to a part of both sides. Alternatively, an opaque contact lens that provides a fogging of the central area may offer better cosmesis. Some patients can achieve peripheral fusion when it is merely a central area that is blended out in this manner. (See also binasal occlusion which obscures the nasal part of the field of view for both eyes.)

A more drastic measure is the insertion of an opaque intraocular lens to obscure the vision of one eye.

== History ==
In 1935, ophthalmologist Alfred Bielschowsky coined the term horror fusionis for this condition. In his case description, the condition was present years after surgical correction of strabismus acquired during childhood and co-existed with aniseikonia. Subsequently, spectacles for size correction ("iseikonic correction") allowed binocular fusion with depth perception to be achieved. Bielschowsky took note that the condition reappeared whenever the spectacles were not worn.
