= Prism cover test =

- This video demonstrates what is involved when performing a prism cover test.
- Purpose: measuring strabismus

The prism cover test (PCT) is an objective measurement and the gold standard in measuring strabismus, i.e. ocular misalignment, or a deviation of the eye. It is used by ophthalmologists, orthoptists, and optometrists in order to measure the vertical and horizontal deviation and includes both manifest and latent components. Manifest is defined by the eye deviating constantly or intermittently, whereas latent is where the deviation is normally controlled but becomes present when the eyes are dissociated. A PCT reveals the total deviation and cannot distinguish between latent and manifest strabismus as you are using an alternate cover test.

A number of different instruments are required when performing a PCT.

- Horizontal and vertical prism bars (or loose prisms).
- An occluder
- Near accommodative target. For example, near fixation stick
- Distance target. For example, most commonly a Snellen chart is utilised, however the LogMAR chart is preferred as it has letters of equal legibility, same numbers of letters on each row and uniform spacing between letters and rows This compared to the Snellen Chart which has 'poor reproducibility and reliability'

In order to perform a PCT, you must first perform a cover test as this gives an estimation of the size of the strabismus, thus an approximate starting point on the prism bar. You can also get an indication of presence and type of strabismus by observing the patients' eye and observing corneal reflections, also known as Hirschbergs. It also shows whether the patient has a manifest or latent deviation. If a manifest deviation is present, it reveals which eye has the deviation or if it is alternating between both eyes.

== Indicated in ==
- Patients with manifest and latent strabismus
- Patients with concomitant and incomitant deviations
- Horizontal and vertical deviations
- Patients with good fixation, visual acuity and cooperation
- For accurate (within two prism dioptres) numerical recording that will provide a point of reference for future consultations
- Monitoring the efficacy of various noninvasive treatments and also surgery interventions

== Not indicated in ==
- Cyclotropias or torsional deviations
- Patients with eccentric fixation because the movement of the deviating eye stops when the stimulus falls on the eccentric retinal area used for fixation and not on the fovea
- Patients that do not have simultaneous perception
- Patients that have difficulty with nystagmus
- Unreliable deviations greater than eighty prism dioptres

== Advantages ==
- Provides complete dissociation that gives the maximum angle of deviation
- Provides a comparison of distance and near deviations

== Disadvantages ==
- Can not be used in all types of deviations as above in 'Not indicated in'

== Method ==
The prism cover test must be conducted at near (33 cm), at distance (6m) and if necessary at greater than 6 metres. Before commencing the test, ensure the patient is sitting upright with their chin and head straight. Patients with a head tilt (abnormal head posture) are 'not formally controlled by using a bite bar or chin rest' and are always tested with their head tilt and then without their head tilt

The results leading on from the cover test will give you an indication of the type of deviation and which way you should hold your prism for the next stage of the test. Either BASE IN for an exodeviation (eye turned out), BASE OUT for an esodeviation (eye turned in), BASE UP for a hypodeviation (eye turned down) or BASE DOWN for a hyperdeviation (eye turned up).

Steps: 1. The patient should be measured in primary position first and then in any other positions of gaze of concern. For near fixation, the patient should hold an accommodative target (fixation stick) at 33 cm, ensuring it is in line with their visual axis. By having the patient read out loud the letters at the top of the fixation stick, it is easy to ensure they are maintaining their accommodation.

2. The examiner then holds the prism bar over the patients deviating eye, starting at a small strength prism, however, if the deviation on the cover test appeared to be large, a larger strength prism may be used to achieve results quicker.

3. With the prism present, an alternate cover test is performed. It is important that an alternate cover test is performed correctly in order to ensure maximum dissociation as we are determining the total deviation size which includes both latent and manifest.

Note: It is important to ensure the patient maintains good fixation, by continuing to look at the near fixation stick.

4. As the alternate cover test is performed, the examiner watches the patients eye for movement. If movement is seen, the prism bar is moved to increase the power. If the 'deviation exceeds 50 prism dioptres, such that a single prism bar cannot be used', prisms can either be stacked or split

5. Prism strength is increased until the eye under the prism produces no movement, meaning the deviation is neutralised.

6. To confirm neutralisation the next prism of increasing strength should produce a movement in the opposite direction indicating overcorrection.

7. Once the results for the near PCT have been recorded, the procedure should be repeated at 6m with the Snellen chart and if needed at greater than 6m by patient fixating out the window.

8. Continue the test until neutralisation has been established.

== Recording ==
The PCT recordings assist in classification and diagnosis of specific strabismic conditions by comparing the size of the deviation from near to distance and also in other various positions of gaze.

When recording the results obtained on a PCT it must be noted:

- If correction (glasses or contact lenses) was worn at the time of measurement
- The fixation distance where the prism neutralised the deviation. That way we can gain an understanding as to whether it increases or decreases in size in different positions of gaze and therefore make a diagnosis of whether it is a concomitant or incomitant deviation.
- The prism base utilised. For example, Base in (BI), Base out (BO), Base up (BU) or Base down (BD).
- The angle of the deviation with the units in prism dioptres
- Which eye is fixating and which eye is deviating
- Whether the test was performed with or without an abnormal head posture

== Examples of recording ==
               PCT cc  (D) 12 p.d BI  6 p.d BU (FL) (N) 18 p.d BI  6 p.d BU (FL)

or

               PCT cc  (D) 12 p.d BI  R/L 6 p.d (FR&L)     (N) 18 p.d BI  R/L 6 p.d (FR&L)

== Interpretation ==
In the first example, it has been noted that when conducting the PCT, this patient wore correction, was fixing left and has a twelve prism dioptre exotropia in the distance. At near they have a larger exotropic deviation measuring 18 prism dioptres. They also have a right hypertropia of six prism dioptres. This means that when the PCT was performed, the deviating eye was neutralised and no movement was seen at these points on the prism bar.

== Considerations ==
- Ensure prisms are held straight, if they are held off centre the power of the prism will not be accurate. There are two types of prisms, the first type is glass prisms which need to be held in the prentice position and the second type is plastic prisms that need to be positioned in the frontal plane.
- Try to estimate the angle of deviation before placing the prism over the affected eye, this way time can be saved in busy clinics and especially with children who may have a short attention span.
- In larger deviations when stacking prisms (see image for table of stacking prisms) or prism bars it may be easier to place one before each eye to better observe if there is any movement taking place.
- The cover should be altered slowly enough to give the patient time to fixate accurately and avoid fusion by continued use of alternate cover test.
- To control accommodation with a fixation target ensure it is maintained by asking the patient to identify the next letter.
