= Hirschberg test =

- Positive Hirschberg sign: the light falls on the centre of the right pupil, but is medial to the centre of the left pupil; therefore, the person in the picture has left exotropia.
- Synonyms: Hirschberg corneal reflex test
- Purpose: whether a person has strabismus

In the fields of optometry and ophthalmology, the Hirschberg test, also Hirschberg corneal reflex test, is a screening test that can be used to assess whether a person has strabismus (ocular misalignment).

A photographic version of the Hirschberg test is used to quantify strabismus.

== Technique ==
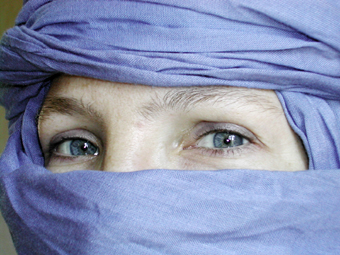
Negative Hirschberg sign: the reflections form congruent points on both corneas.

It is performed by shining a light in the person's eyes and observing where the light reflects off the corneas. In a person with normal ocular alignment the light reflex lies slightly nasal from the center of the cornea (approximately 11 prism diopters—or 0.5mm from the pupillary axis), as a result of the cornea acting as a temporally-turned convex mirror to the observer. When doing the test, the light reflexes of both eyes are compared, and will be symmetrical in an individual with normal fixation. For an abnormal result, based on where the light lands on the cornea, the examiner can detect if there is an exotropia (abnormal eye is turned out), esotropia (abnormal eye is turned in), hypertropia (abnormal eye higher than the normal one) or hypotropia (abnormal eye is lower than the normal one).

=== Interpretation ===
In exotropia the light lands on the medial aspect of the cornea. In esotropia the light lands on the lateral aspect of the cornea. In hypertropia the light lands on the inferior aspect of the cornea. In hypotropia the light lands on the superior aspect of the cornea. A cover test can tell you the extent of the eso/exo-tropia.

Individuals can suffer from several tropias at once. In Graves ophthalmopathy, it is not uncommon to see an esotropia (due to pathology of the medial rectus muscle) co-morbid with a hypotropia (due to pathology of the inferior rectus muscle).

=== Krimsky Test ===
The Krimsky test is similar to the Hirschberg test, but differs in its use of prisms employed to quantitate deviation of ocular misalignment by determining how much prism is required to centre the reflex. The Krimsky test is advisably used for patients with tropias, but not with phorias.

== History ==
The technique was developed by German ophthalmologist Julius Hirschberg who in 1886 used a candle to observe the light reflex in an eye with strabismus.

== See also ==
- Cover test
- Eye examination
- Terms for anatomical location
