= Retinal birefringence scanning =

Non-invasive eye examination technique

- Purpose: detect central fixation of the eye

Retinal birefringence scanning (RBS) is a method for detecting the central fixation of the eye. The method can be used in pediatric ophthalmology for screening purposes. By simultaneously measuring the central fixation of both eyes, small- and large-angle strabismus can be detected. The method is not invasive and requires little cooperation by the patient, so it can be used for detecting strabismus in young children. The method provides a reliable detection of strabismus and has also been used for detecting certain kinds of amblyopia. RBS uses the human eye's birefringent properties to identify the position of the fovea and the direction of gaze, and thereby to measure any binocular misalignment.

== Principle ==
Birefringent material has a refractive index that depends on the polarization state and propagation direction of light. The main contribution to the birefringence of the eye stems from the Henle fibers. These fibers (named after Friedrich Gustav Jakob Henle) are photoreceptor axons that are arranged in a radially symmetric pattern, extending outward from the fovea, which is the most sensitive part of the retina. When polarized light strikes the fovea, the layer of Henle fibers produces a characteristic pattern, and the strength and contrast of this pattern, as well as the orientation of its bright parts, depend on the polarization of the light that reaches the retina. An analysis of this pattern allows the position of the fovea and the direction of gaze to be determined.

Binocular RBS has been used for diagnosing strabismus (including microstrabismus) in young children, and has also been proposed for diagnosing amblyopia by detecting strabismus and by detecting reduced fixation accuracy.

== Limitations ==
However, also birefringent properties of the cornea and the retinal nerve fiber layer are sources of birefringence. Corneal birefringence varies widely from one individual to another, as well as from one location to another for the same individual, thus can confound measurements.
