= Hypertropia =

Condition of misalignment of the eyes

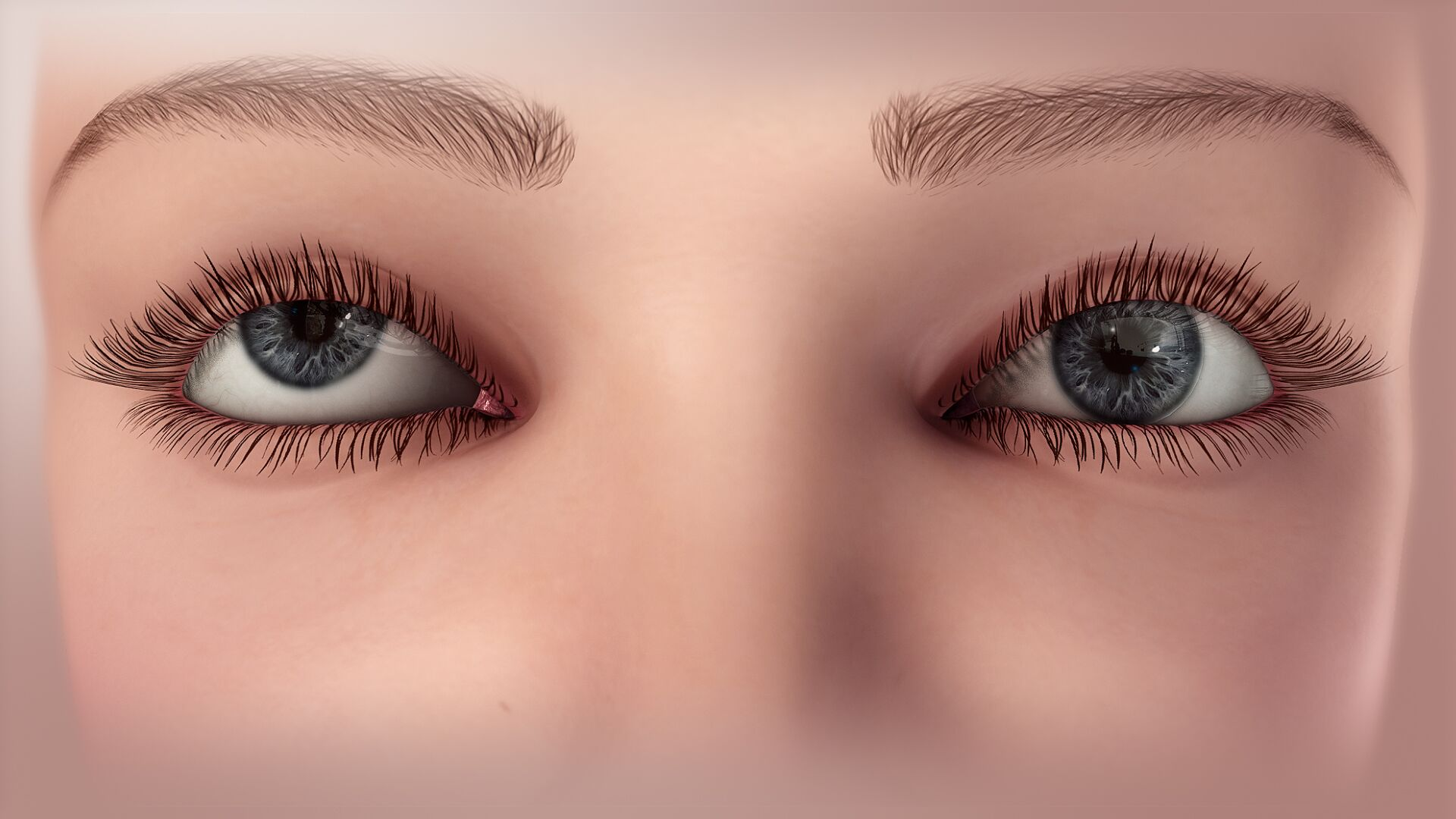
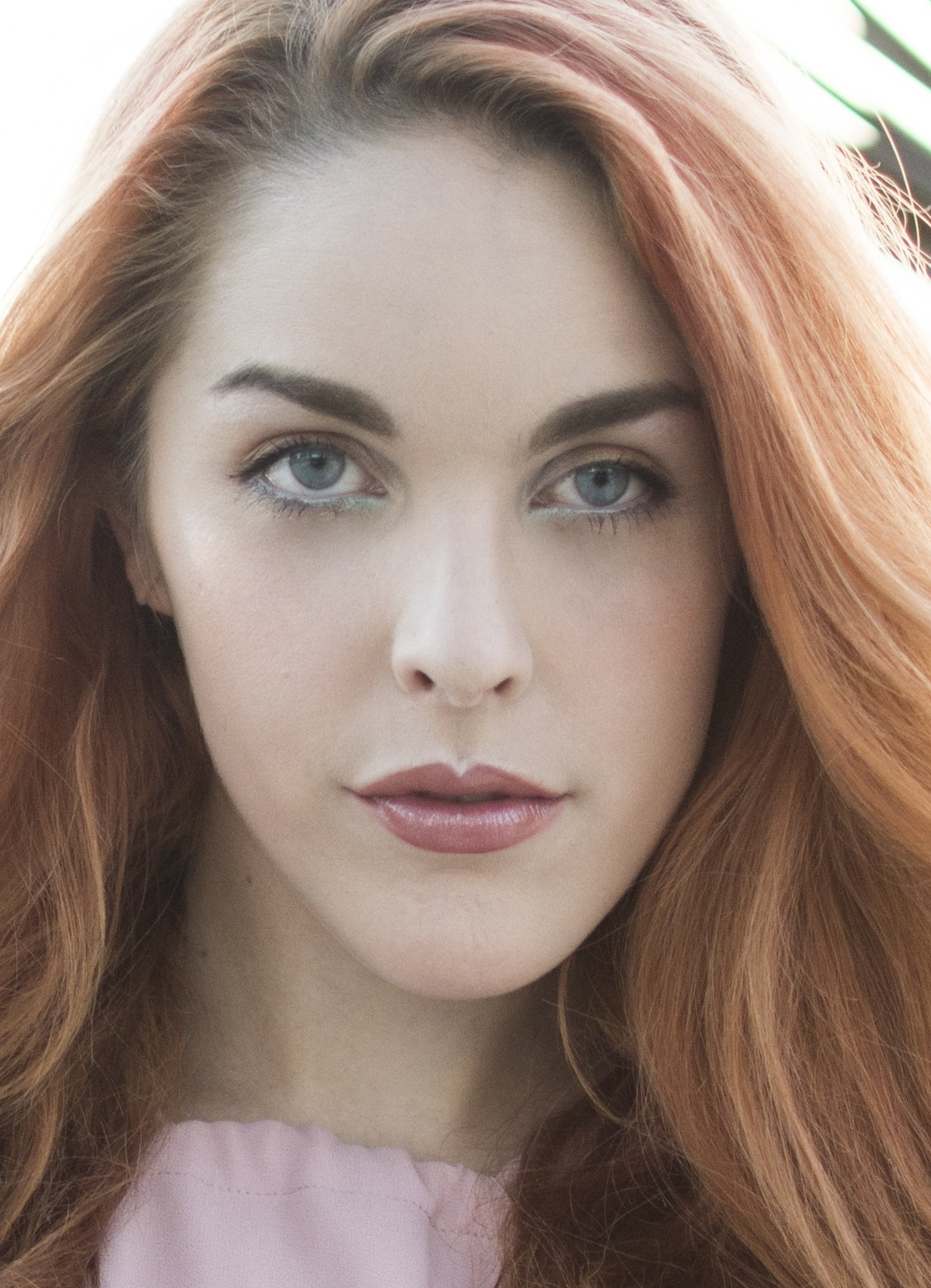
- Misaligned eyes Amarna Miller in 2017 The actress Amarna Miller has hypertropia.
- Specialty: Ophthalmology

Hypertropia is a condition of misalignment of the eyes (strabismus), whereby the visual axis of one eye is higher than the fellow fixating eye. Hypotropia is the similar condition, focus being on the eye with the visual axis lower than the fellow fixating eye. Dissociated vertical deviation is a special type of hypertropia leading to slow upward drift of one or rarely both eyes, usually when the patient is inattentive.

== Presentation ==
=== Associated defects ===
Refractive errors such as hyperopia and anisometropia may be associated abnormalities found in patients with vertical strabismus. The vertical miscoordination between the two eyes may lead to

- strabismic amblyopia due to cerebral suppression of the deviating eye, particularly when onset occurs well before adolescence, while neural pathways are still highly plastic
- impaired depth perception, especially in the same instances
- diplopia or double vision, particularly when onset occurs after childhood, when corresponding neural pathways have been so fixed as to prevent the brain from suppressing the deviant image
- cosmetic defect, most noticed by parents of a child so affected and in photographs
- face turn, depending on presence of binocular vision in a particular gaze
- cyclotropia, a cyclotorsional deviation of the eyes (rotation around the visual axis), particularly when the root cause is an oblique muscle paresis causing the hypertropia

== Causes ==
Hypertropia may be either congenital or acquired, and misalignment is due to imbalance in extraocular muscle function. The superior rectus, inferior rectus, superior oblique, and inferior oblique muscles affect the vertical movement of the eyes. These muscles may be either paretic, restrictive (fibrosis) or overactive effect of the muscles. Congenital cases may have developmental abnormality due to abnormal muscle structure, usually muscle atrophy / hypertrophy or rarely, absence of the muscle and incorrect placement.

Specific & common causes include:

- Superior oblique Palsy / Fourth nerve palsy
- Inferior oblique overaction
- Brown's syndrome
- Duane's retraction syndrome
- Double elevator palsy
- Fibrosis of rectus muscle in Graves Disease (most commonly inferior rectus is involved)
- Surgical trauma to the vertical muscles (e.g. during scleral buckling surgery or cataract surgery causing iatrogenic trauma to the vertical muscles).

Sudden onset hypertropia in a middle aged or elderly adult may be due to compression of the trochlear nerve and mass effect from a tumor, requiring urgent brain imaging using MRI to localise any space occupying lesion. It could also be due to infarction of blood vessels supplying the nerve, due to diabetes and atherosclerosis. In other instances it may be due to an abnormality of neuromuscular transmission, i.e., Myasthenia Gravis.

== Treatment ==
In general, strabismus can be approached and treated with a variety of procedures. Depending on the individual case, treatment options include:

- Correction of refractive errors by glasses
- Prism therapy (if tolerated, to manage diplopia)
- Vision Therapy
- Patching (mainly to manage amblyopia in children and diplopia in adults)
- Botulinum toxin injection
- Surgical correction

Surgical correction of the hypertropia is desired to achieve binocularity, manage diplopia and/or correct the cosmetic defect. Steps to achieve the same depend on mechanism of the hypertropia and identification of the offending muscles causing the misalignment. Various surgical procedures have been described and should be offered after careful examination of eyes, including a detailed orthoptic examination focussing on the disturbances in ocular motility and visual status. Specialty fellowship trained pediatric ophthalmologists and strabismus surgeons are best equipped to deal with these complex procedures.

== See also ==
- List of systemic diseases with ocular manifestations
