= Retinal correspondence =

Relationship between paired retinal visual cells in the eyes

In visual perception, retinal correspondence is the inherent relationship between paired retinal visual cells in the two eyes. Images from one object stimulate both cells, which transmit the information to the brain, permitting a single visual impression localized in the same direction in space.

== Types ==
Normal retinal correspondence (NRC) is a binocular condition in which both foveas work together as corresponding retinal points, with resultant images fused in the occipital cortex of the brain.

Abnormal retinal correspondence (ARC), also called Anomalous retinal correspondence is binocular sensory adaptation to compensate for a long-standing eye deviation (i.e. strabismus). The fovea of the straight (non-deviated) eye and non-foveal retinal point of the deviated eye work together, sometimes permitting single binocular vision.

== See also ==
- Bagolini Striated Glasses Test
- Binocular vision
- Haploscope
- Stereopsis
- Orthoptist
