= Diplopia =

Double vision

- Other names: Double vision
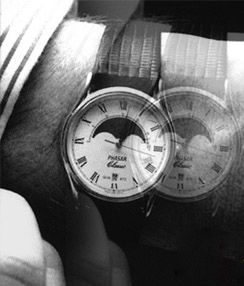
- One way a person might experience double vision
- Specialty: Neurology, ophthalmology

Diplopia is the simultaneous perception of two images of a single object that may be displaced in relation to each other. Also called double vision, it is a loss of visual focus under regular conditions, and is often voluntary. However, when occurring involuntarily, it results from impaired function of the extraocular muscles, where both eyes are still functional, but they cannot turn to target the desired object. Problems with these muscles may be due to mechanical problems, disorders of the neuromuscular junction, disorders of the cranial nerves (III, IV, and VI) that innervate the muscles, and occasionally disorders involving the supranuclear oculomotor pathways or ingestion of toxins.

Diplopia can be one of the first signs of a systemic disease, particularly to a muscular or neurological process, and it may disrupt a person's balance, movement, or reading abilities.

== Causes ==
Diplopia has a diverse range of ophthalmologic, infectious, autoimmune, neurological, and neoplastic causes:

- Abscess
- Aniseikonia
- Anisometropia
- Antipsychotics (haloperidol, fluphenazine, chlorpromazine etc.)
- Atypical parkinsonisms, especially multiple system atrophy and progressive supranuclear palsy
- Botulism
- Brain tumor
- Cannabis
- Cancer
- Damaged third, fourth, or sixth cranial nerves, which control eye movements
- Cataract
- COVID-19
- Diabetes
- Drunkenness
- Fluoroquinolone antibiotics
- Graves disease
- Guillain–Barré syndrome
- Keratoconus
- Lasik complications
- Lyme disease
- Migraine headaches
- Multiple sclerosis
- Myasthenia gravis
- Myalgic encephalomyelitis/chronic fatigue syndrome
- Opioids
- Orbital myositis
- Papilledema
- Trauma
- Sagging eye syndrome (SES)
- Salicylism
- Sinusitis
- Strabismus
- Thyroid eye disease (TED)
- Wernicke's syndrome
- Increased intracranial pressure (compressing the sixth cranial nerve results in diplopia)

== Diagnosis ==
Diplopia is diagnosed mainly by information from the patient. Doctors may use blood tests, physical examinations, computed tomography (CT), or magnetic resonance imaging (MRI) to find the underlying cause.

=== Classification ===
One of the first steps in diagnosing diplopia is often to see whether one of two major classifications may be eliminated. That involves blocking one eye to see which symptoms are evident in each eye alone. Persisting blurry or double vision with one eye closed is classified as monocular diplopia.

=== Binocular ===
Binocular diplopia is the other one in which the blurring of vision occurs only when the patient looks through both eyes simultaneously. It is common and occurs in approximately 10.0% to 40.0% of zygomatic complex injuries. Furthermore, diplopia may be transient or persistent. Inadequate diagnosis and treatment at improper times and tethering or fibrosis of muscles may lead to persistent diplopia.

Binocular diplopia is double vision arising as a result of strabismus (in layman's terms "cross-eyed"), the misalignment of the two eyes relative to each other, either esotropia (inward) or exotropia (outward). In such a case while the fovea of one eye is directed at the object of regard, the fovea of the other is directed elsewhere, and the image of the object of regard falls on an extrafoveal area of the retina. Acute diplopia is a diagnostic challenge. The most common cause of acute diplopia are ocular motor nerve palsies (OMP).

The brain calculates the visual direction of an object based upon the position of its image relative to the fovea. Images falling on the fovea are seen as being directly ahead, while those falling on retina outside the fovea may be seen as above, below, right, or left of straight ahead depending upon the area of retina stimulated. Thus, when the eyes are misaligned, the brain perceives two images of one target object, as the target object simultaneously stimulates different, noncorresponding, retinal areas in either eye, thus producing double vision.

This correlation of particular areas of the retina in one eye with the same areas in the other is known as retinal correspondence. This relationship also gives rise to an associated phenomenon of binocular diplopia, although one that is rarely noted by those experiencing diplopia. Because the fovea of one eye corresponds to the fovea of the other, images falling on the two foveae are projected to the same point in space. Thus, when the eyes are misaligned, two different objects will be perceived as superimposed in the same space. This phenomenon is known as 'visual confusion'.

The brain naturally guards against double vision. In an attempt to avoid double vision, the brain can sometimes ignore the image from one eye, a process known as suppression. The ability to suppress is to be found particularly in childhood when the brain is still developing. Thus, those with childhood strabismus almost never complain of diplopia, while adults who develop strabismus almost always do. This ability to suppress might seem an entirely positive adaptation to strabismus, but in the developing child it can prevent the proper development of vision in the affected eye, resulting in amblyopia. Some adults can also suppress their diplopia, but their suppression is rarely as deep or as effective and takes much longer to establish; thus, they are not at risk of permanently compromising their vision. In some cases, diplopia disappears without medical intervention, but in other cases, the cause of the double vision may still be present.

Certain people with diplopia who cannot achieve fusion and yet do not suppress may display a certain type of spasm-like irregular movement of the eyes in the vicinity of the fixation point (see: Horror fusionis).

=== Monocular ===
Diplopia can also occur when viewing with only one eye; this is called monocular diplopia, or where the patient perceives more than two images, monocular polyopia. While serious causes rarely may be behind monocular diplopia symptoms, this is much less often the case than with binocular diplopia. The differential diagnosis of multiple image perception includes the consideration of such conditions as corneal surface keratoconus, subluxation of the lens, a structural defect within the eye, a lesion in the anterior visual cortex, or nonorganic conditions, but diffraction-based (rather than geometrical) optical models have shown that common optical conditions, especially astigmatism, can also produce this symptom.

=== Temporary ===
Temporary binocular diplopia can be caused by alcohol intoxication or head injuries, such as concussion (if temporary double vision does not resolve quickly, one should see an optometrist or ophthalmologist immediately). It can also be a side effect of benzodiazepines or opioids, particularly if used recreationally in larger doses, the antiepileptic drugs phenytoin, zonisamide and lamotrigine, as well as the hypnotic drug zolpidem and the dissociative drugs ketamine and dextromethorphan. Temporary diplopia can also be caused by tired or strained eye muscles. If diplopia appears with other symptoms such as fatigue and acute or chronic pain, the patient should see an ophthalmologist immediately.

=== Voluntary ===
Some people can consciously uncouple their eyes, either by overfocusing closely (i.e., going cross-eyed) or unfocusing. Also, while looking at one object behind another object, the foremost object's image is doubled (for example, placing one's finger in front of one's face while reading text on a computer monitor). In this sense, double vision is neither dangerous nor harmful, and may even be enjoyable. It makes viewing stereograms possible.

Monocular diplopia may be induced in many individuals, even those with normal eyesight, with simple defocusing experiments involving fine, high-contrast lines.

== Treatment ==
The appropriate treatment for binocular diplopia depends upon the cause of the condition producing the symptoms. Efforts must first be made to identify and treat the underlying cause of the problem. Treatment options include eye exercises, wearing an eye patch on alternative eyes, prism correction, and in more extreme situations, surgery or botulinum toxin.

== See also ==
- Binocular vision
- Monocular rivalry
- Orthoptics
