= Binocular summation =

Optical concept

Binocular summation refers to the improved visual performance of binocular vision compared to that of monocular vision. Use of binocular vision helps with the perception of depth (stereopsis), and by combining the information received in each eye, improves visual acuity, sensitivity to contrast and brightness differences, and perception to flicker. Though binocular summation generally enhances binocular vision, it can worsen binocular vision relative to monocular vision under certain conditions. Binocular summation decreases with age and when large interocular differences are present.

== Visual improvements ==
Some of the ways in which binocular summation improves binocular visual performance are

- Brightness perception. The binocularly perceived brightness is larger than the brightness seen by each individual eye. This helps with detection of dim lights and also provoke pupil to decrease its size (aperture), which improves focusing.
- Flicker perception. Binocular summation can increase the critical flicker fusion threshold, the highest perceivable flicker rate before the image appears continuous. The CFF is increased when both eyes see the same flicker, and it is decreased when the flicker for one eye is out of phase with the other. Binocular summation also increases the perceived brightness of the flicker when both inputs are in phase.
- Contrast sensitivity.
- Visual acuity.

A practical measure of binocularity is the binocular summation ratio BSR, which is the ratio of binocular contrast sensitivity to the contrast sensitivity of the better eye.

$$BSR = \frac{CS_\text{binocular}}{CS_\text{better eye}}$$

== Models for binocular brightness ==
One might expect the inputs from each eye to simply add together, and that the perceived brightness with two eyes is twice that of a single eye. However, the perceived brightness with two eyes is only slightly higher compared to a single eye. If one eye sees a bright scene, the perceived brightness will actually decrease if the other eye is presented with a dim light. This counterintuitive phenomenon is known as Fechner's Paradox. Several different models have been proposed to explain how the inputs from each eye are combined.

The renowned physicist Erwin Schrödinger, known for his contributions to quantum theory, had a fascination for psychology and he explored topics related to color perception. Schrödinger (1926) put forth an equation for binocular brightness and contrast combination where each monocular input is weighted by the ratio of the signal strength from that eye to the sum of the signal from both eyes. The inputs $f_l$ and $f_l$ are monocular brightness flux signals. This equation can be thought of as the sum of the lengths of two vectors.

$$B = f_l \frac{f_l}{f_l + f_r} + f_r \frac{f_r}{f_l + f_r} = \frac{f_l^2 + f_r^2}{f_l + f_r}$$

MacLeod (1972) expanded upon Schrödinger's work by proposing the following formula for the signal strength of a neural signal $f$ in terms of internal noise $f_0$, luminance difference across the contour $l$, and threshold luminance difference $l_0$.

$$f =
\begin{cases}
f_0 + \log{(\frac{l}{l_0})}, & \text{if }l \ge l_0 \\
f_0 & \text{if }l < l_0 \\
\end{cases}$$

== Process ==
It is still uncertain exactly how this process is performed by the brain and remains an active area of research. The mechanism can be explained by some combination of probability summation, neural summation, and effects due to binocular-monocular differences in pupil size, accommodation, fixation, and rivalry. Probability summation comes from the principle that there is a greater chance of detecting a visual stimulus with two eyes than with one eye.

There are five possible results when the input stimuli are summed together. These are

- Binocular facilitation. The summation is more than twice that of a single input.
- Complete binocular summation. The summation is exactly twice that of a single input.
- Partial binocular summation. The summation is greater than that of a single input, but less than twice as large.
- No binocular summation. The summation is the same as a single input.
- Binocular inhibition. The summation is lower than worse than a single input.

== Binocular Fusion ==
Both motor fusion and sensory fusion mechanisms are used to combine the two images into a single perceived image. Motor fusion describes the vergence eye movements that rotate the eyes about the vertical axis. Sensory fusion is the psychological process of the visual system that creates a single image perceived by the brain.

== See also ==
- Binocular disparity
- Binocular rivalry
- Binoviewer
