= Monofixation syndrome =

Small deviations of eye alignment in binocular vision

- Other names: Microtropia, microstrabismus
- Specialty: Ophthalmology Optometry

Monofixation syndrome (MFS) (also: microtropia or microstrabismus) is an eye condition defined by less-than-perfect binocular vision. It is defined by a small angle deviation with suppression of the deviated eye and the presence of binocular peripheral fusion. That is, MFS implies peripheral fusion without central fusion.

Aside the manifest small-angle deviation ("tropia"), subjects with MFS often also have a large-angle latent deviation ("phoria"). Their stereoacuity is often in the range of 3000 to 70 arcseconds, and a small central suppression scotoma of 2 to 5 deg.

A rare condition, MFS is estimated to affect only 1% of the general population. There are three distinguishable forms of this condition: primary constant, primary decompensating and consecutive MFS. It is believed that primary MFS is a result of a primary sensorial defect, predisposing to anomalous retinal correspondence.

Secondary MFS is a frequent outcome of surgical treatment of congenital esotropia. A study of 1981 showed MFS to result in the vast majority of cases if surgical alignment is reached before the age of 24 months and only in a minority of cases if it is reached later.

MFS was first described by Marshall Parks.
