= Strabismus =

Eyes not aligning when looking at something

- Other names: Heterotropia, crossed eyes, squint
- A person with exotropia, an outward deviated eye
- Pronunciation: /strəˈbɪzməs/
- Specialty: Ophthalmology, Optometry, Orthoptics
- Symptoms: Nonaligned eyes
- Complications: Amblyopia, double vision
- Types: Esotropia (eyes crossed); exotropia (eyes diverge); hypertropia (eyes vertically misaligned)
- Causes: Muscle dysfunction, farsightedness, problems in the brain, trauma, infections
- Risk factors: Premature birth, cerebral palsy, family history
- Diagnostic method: Observing light reflected from the pupil
- Differential diagnosis: Cranial nerve disease, convergence insufficiency
- Treatment: Glasses, vision therapy, surgery
- Frequency: ~2% (children)

Strabismus is an eye disorder in which the eyes do not properly align with each other when looking at an object. The eye that is pointed at an object can alternate. The condition may be present occasionally or constantly. If present during a large part of childhood, it may result in amblyopia ("lazy eyes") and loss of depth perception. If onset is during adulthood, it is more likely to result in double vision.

Strabismus can occur out of muscle dysfunction (e.g. myasthenia gravis), farsightedness, problems in the brain, trauma, or infections. Risk factors include premature birth, cerebral palsy, and a family history of the condition. Types include esotropia, where the eyes are crossed ("cross eyed"); exotropia, where the eyes diverge ("lazy eyed" or "wall eyed"); and hypertropia or hypotropia, where they are vertically misaligned. They can also be classified by whether the problem is present in all directions a person looks (comitant) or varies by direction (incomitant). Another condition that produces similar symptoms is a cranial nerve disease. Diagnosis may be made by observing the light reflecting from the person's eyes and finding that it is not centered on the pupil. This is known as the Hirschberg reflex test.

Treatment depends on the type of strabismus and the underlying cause. This may include the use of eyeglasses and possibly surgery. Some types benefit from early surgery. Strabismus occurs in about 2% of children. The term comes from the Ancient Greek word στραβισμός (strabismós), meaning 'a squinting'. Other terms for the condition include "squint" and "cast of the eye".

== Signs and symptoms ==
Aligned vergence

Esotropia

Exotropia

When observing a person with strabismus, the misalignment of the eyes may be quite apparent. A person with a constant eye turn of significant magnitude is very easy to notice. However, a small magnitude or intermittent strabismus can easily be missed upon casual observation. In any case, an eye care professional can conduct various tests, such as cover testing, to determine the full extent of the strabismus.

The simple line drawings on the right only briefly depict the positional relationship between the visual axis of the eye and the head. In fact, the following statements provide a more accurate description of patients' visual experience. The reasoning is as follows: For a normal person, the light path from an object located on the outer side of the visual axis (toward the temple) should cross the visual axis and form an image on the retina, on the inner side of the visual axis (and thus of the eyeball), so that the object is perceived as being located outside the eyeball. For a patient with esotropia, since the affected eye is deviated inward (and the actual visual axis is therefore also deviated inward), when the visual axes are supposed to converge on a given fixation target, the light path that should be aligned with the visual axis actually crosses the visual axis instead, so that a false image is perceived as being displaced outward (toward the temple) relative to the image from the dominant eye. The opposite is true for exotropia.

Symptoms of strabismus include double vision and eye strain. To avoid double vision, the brain may adapt by ignoring one eye. In children, prolonged suppression of the misaligned eye may lead to amblyopia, which can result in permanent vision loss if not treated early. In this case, often no noticeable symptoms are seen other than a minor loss of depth perception. This deficit may not be noticeable in someone who has had strabismus since birth or early childhood, as they have likely learned to judge depth and distances using monocular cues. However, a constant unilateral strabismus causing constant suppression is a risk for amblyopia in children. Small-angle and intermittent strabismus are more likely to cause disruptive visual symptoms. In addition to headaches and eye strain, symptoms may include an inability to read comfortably, fatigue when reading, and unstable or "jittery" vision.

=== Psychosocial effects ===
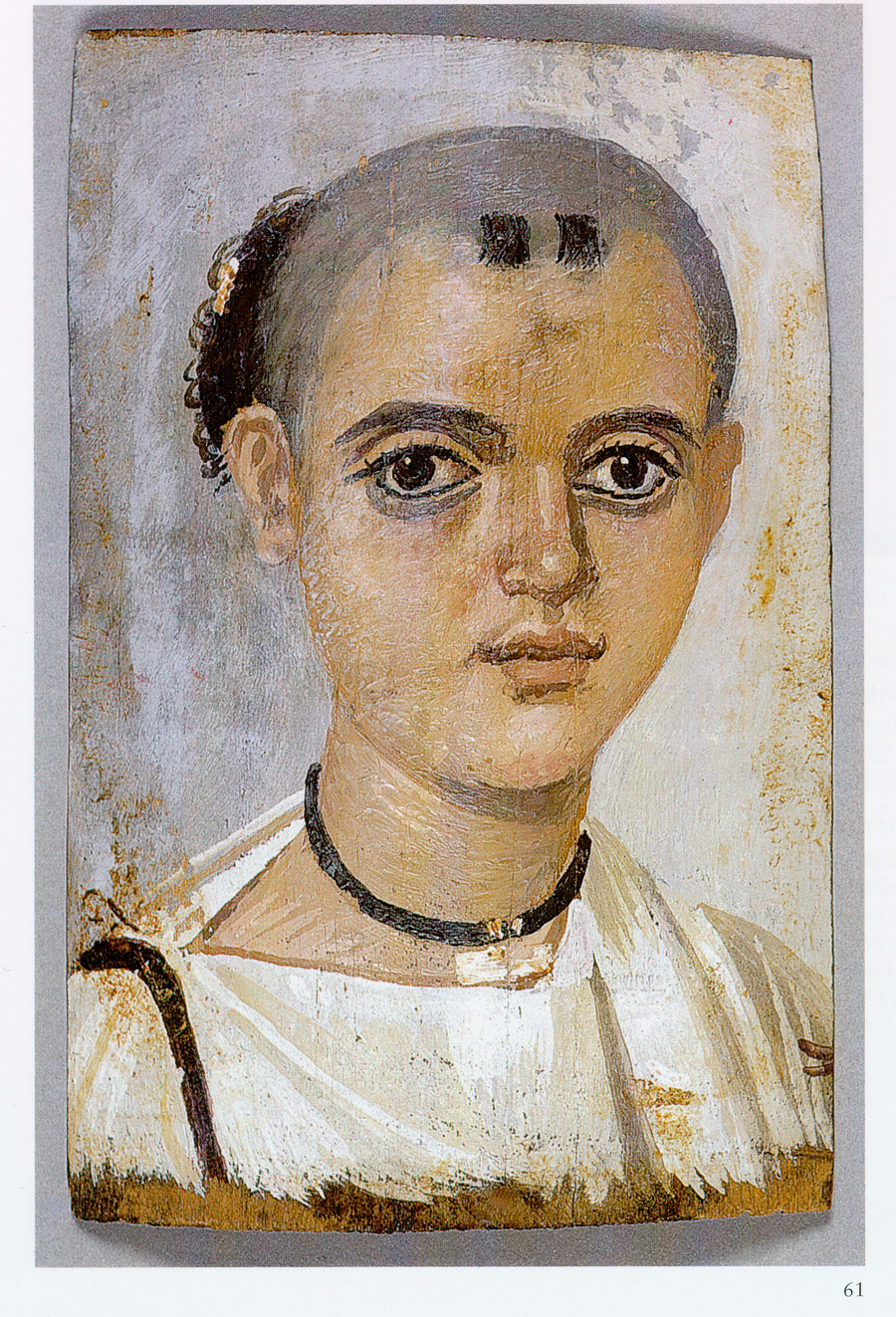
Fayum mummy portrait, c. 150–200 AD

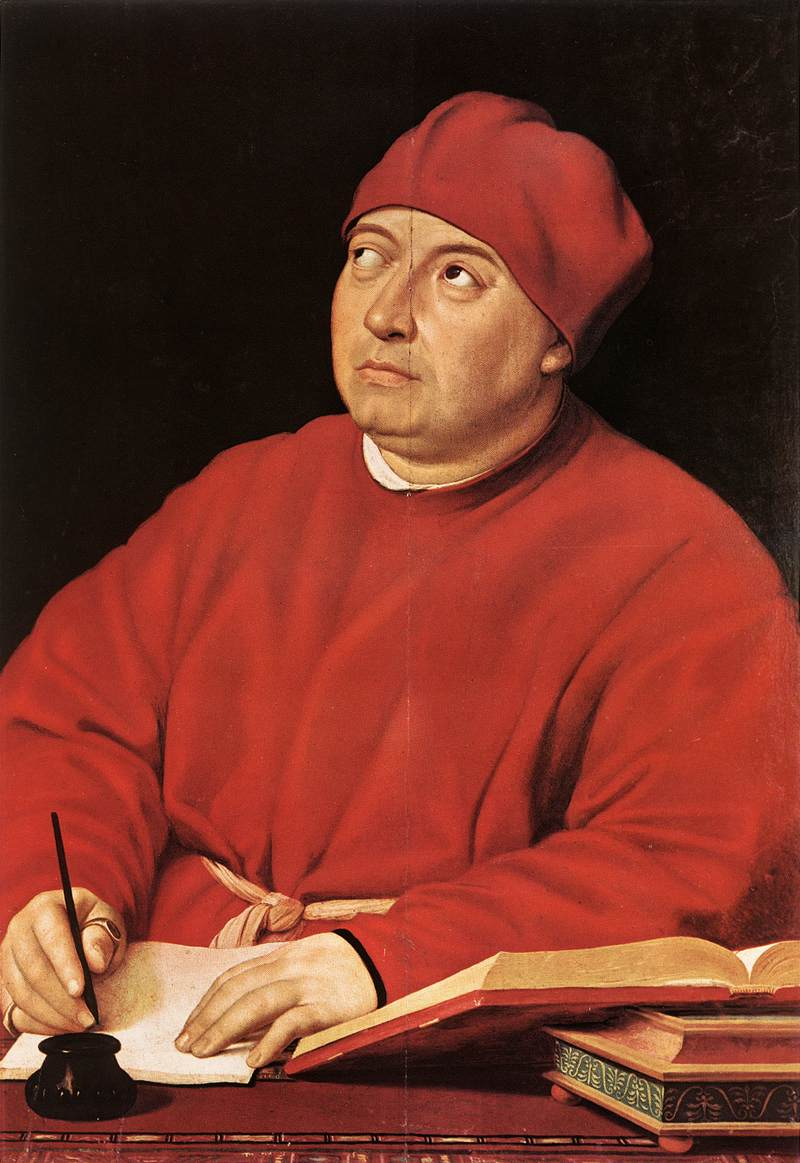
Tommaso Inghirami

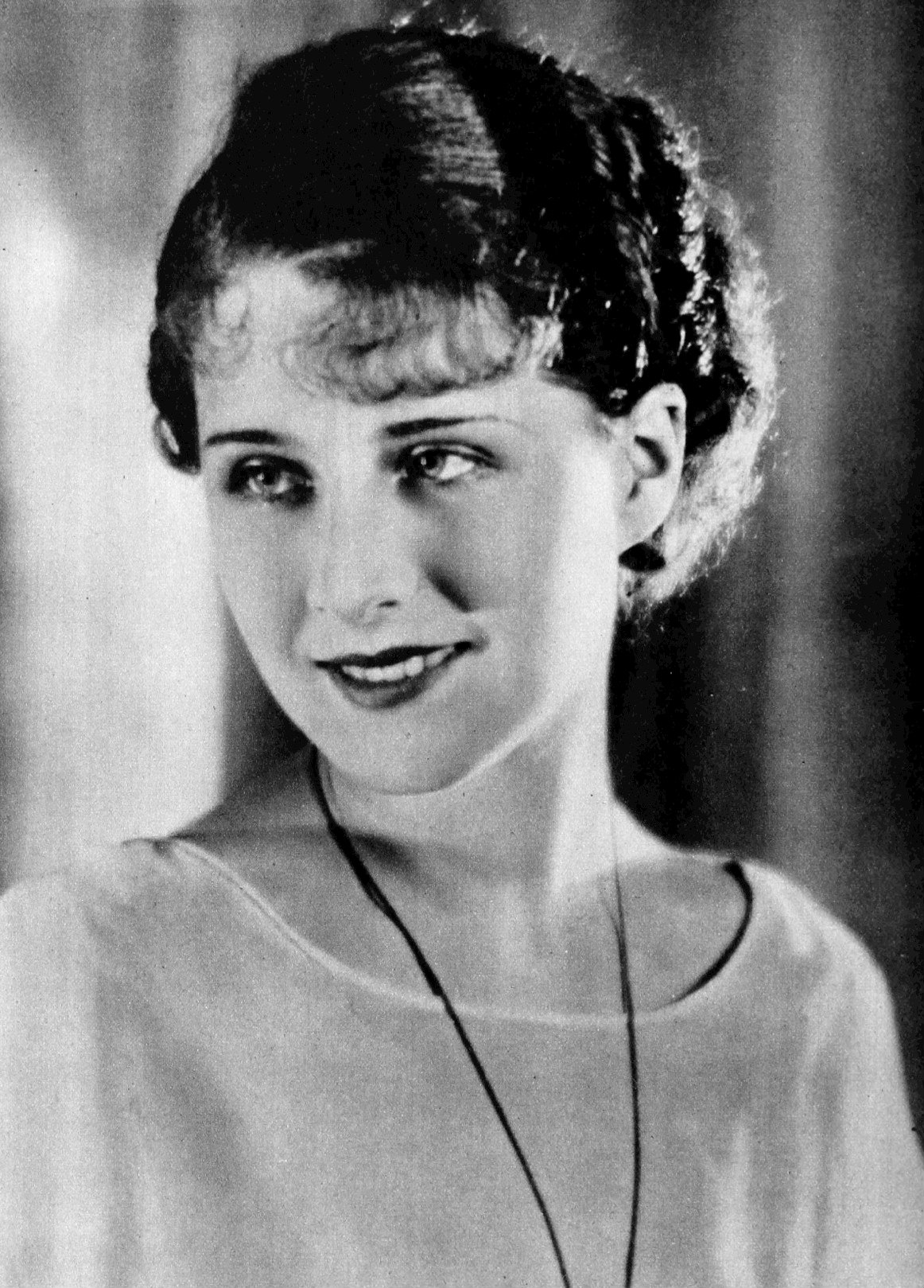
Norma Shearer

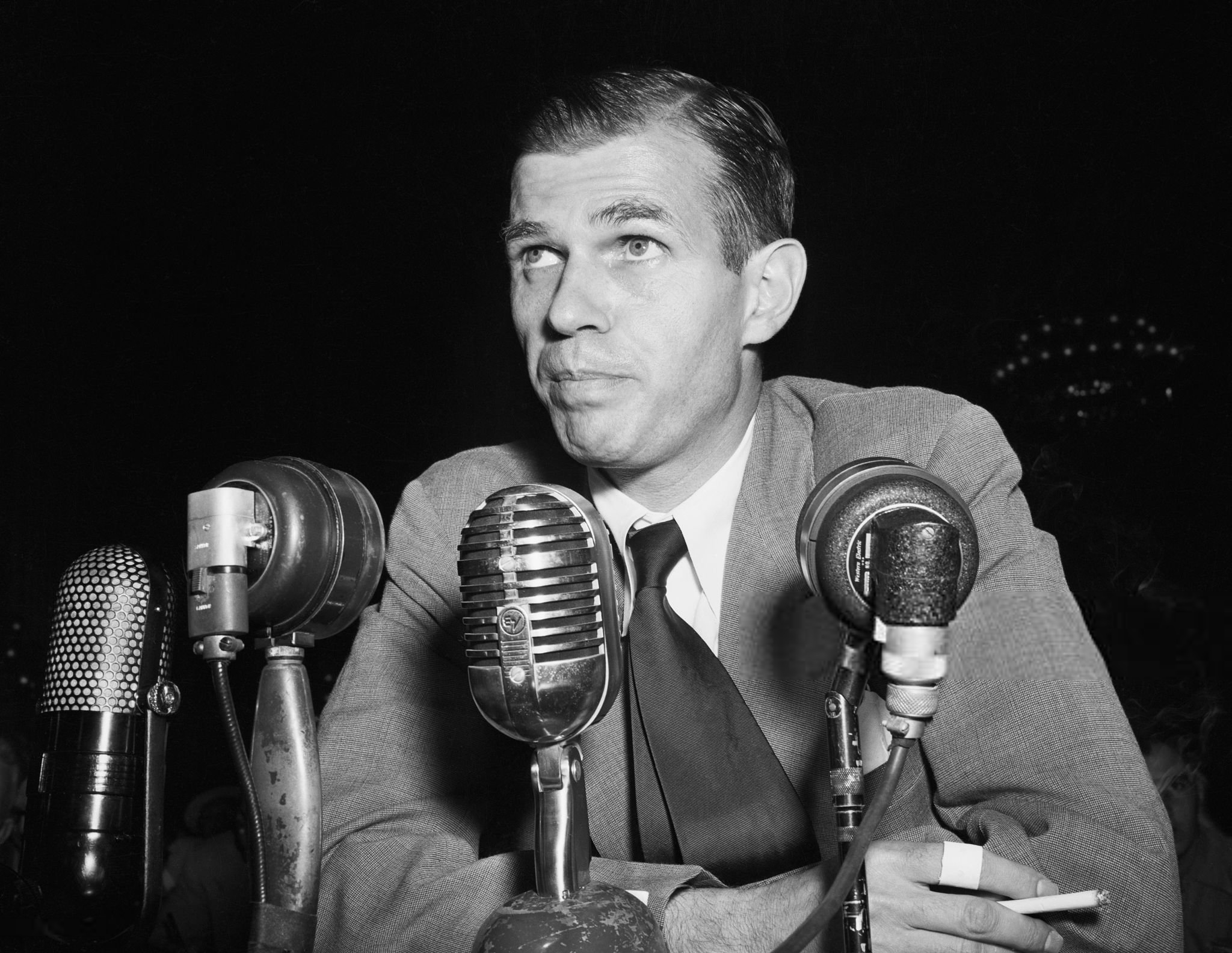
Alger Hiss

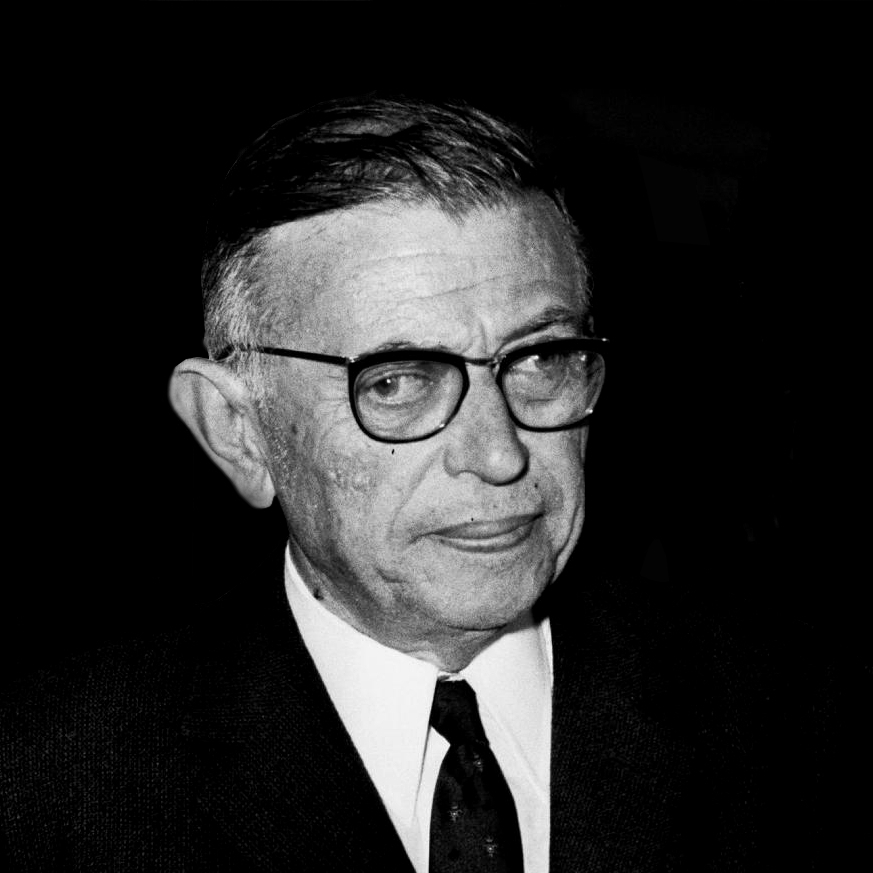
Jean-Paul Sartre

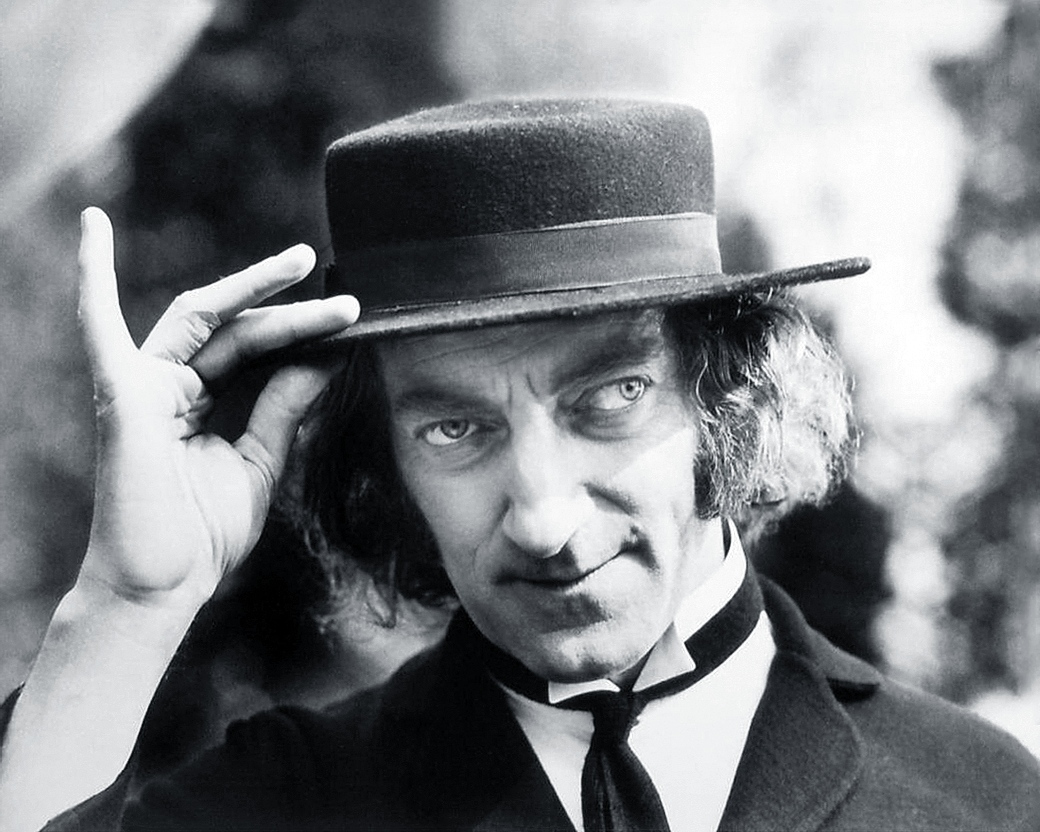
Marty Feldman

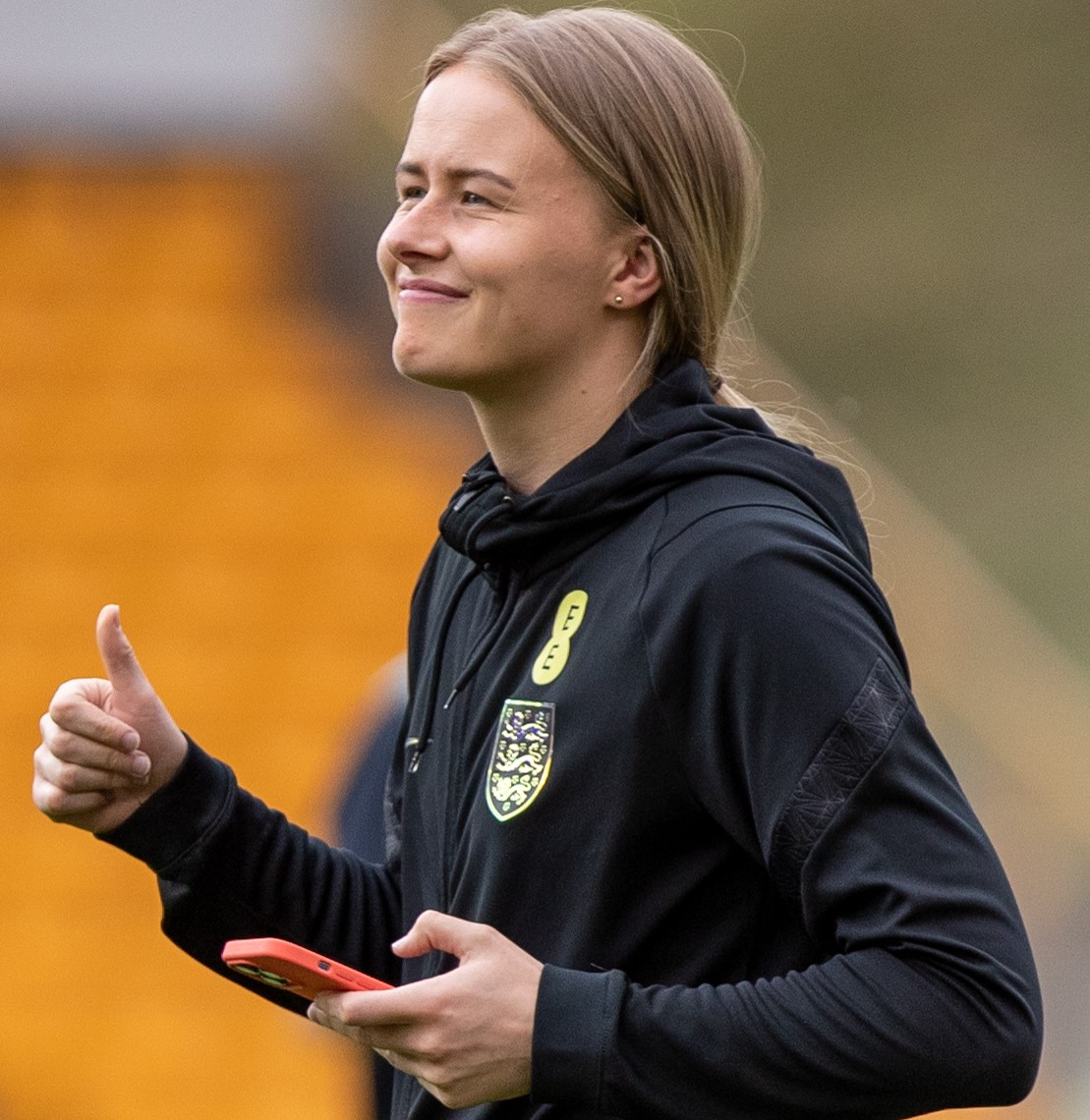
Chelsea goalkeeper Hannah Hampton has strabismus.

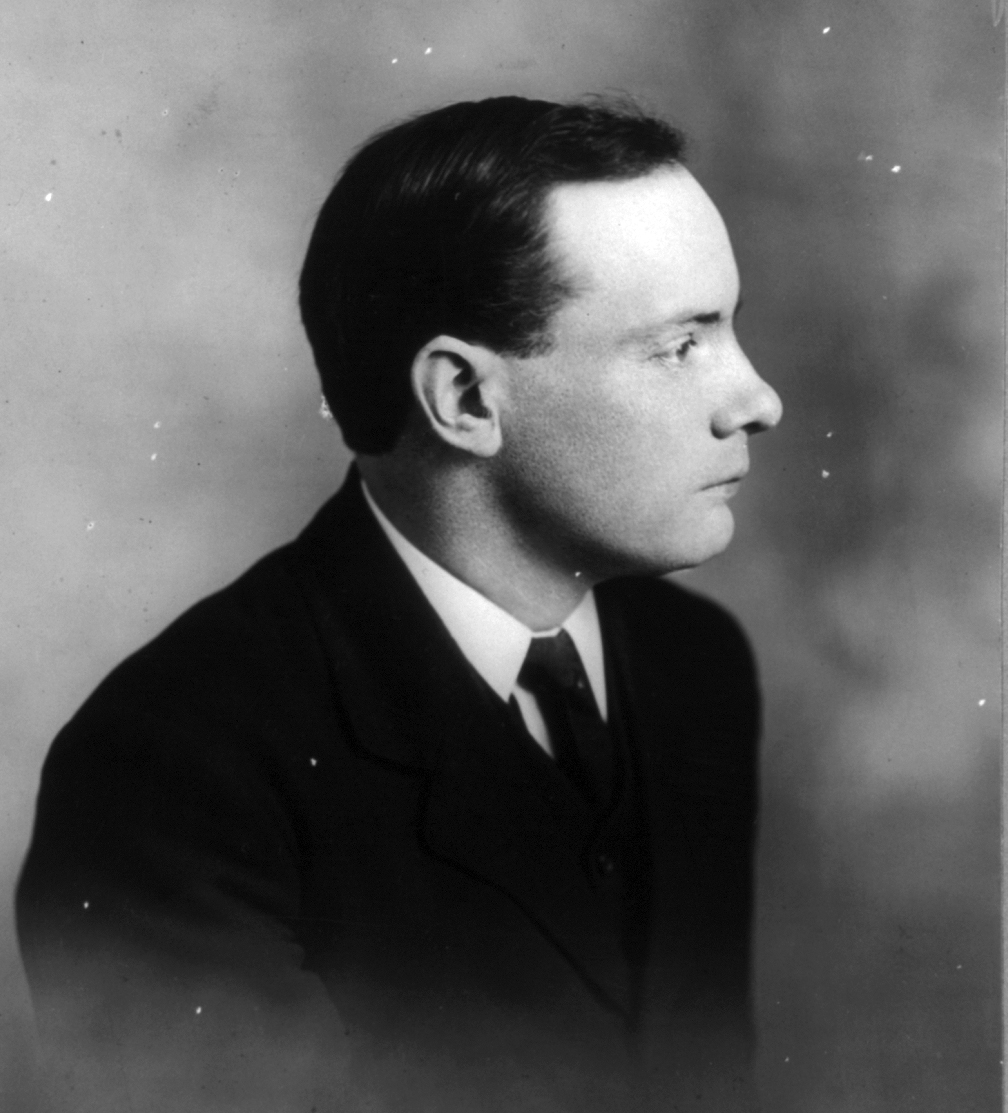
Patrick Pearse almost always insisted on being photographed in side profile, to conceal his strabismus.

People of all ages who have noticeable strabismus may experience psychosocial difficulties. Attention has also been drawn to potential socioeconomic impact resulting from cases of detectable strabismus. A socioeconomic consideration exists as well in the context of decisions regarding strabismus treatment, including efforts to re-establish binocular vision and the possibility of stereopsis recovery.

One study has shown that strabismic children commonly exhibit behaviors marked by higher degrees of inhibition, anxiety, and emotional distress, often leading to outright emotional disorders. These disorders are often related to a negative perception of the child by peers. This is due not only to an altered aesthetic appearance but also because of the inherent symbolic nature of the eye and gaze and the vitally important role they play in an individual's life as social components. For some, these issues improved dramatically following strabismus surgery. Notably, strabismus interferes with normal eye contact, often causing embarrassment, anger, and feelings of awkwardness, thereby affecting social communication in a fundamental way, with a possible negative effect on self esteem.

Children with strabismus, particularly those with exotropia, an outward turn, may be more likely to develop a mental health disorder than normal-sighted children. Researchers have theorized that esotropia (an inward turn) was not found to be linked to a higher propensity for mental illness due to the age range of the participants, as well as the shorter follow-up time period; esotropic children were monitored to a mean age of 15.8 years, compared with 20.3 years for the exotropic group.

Investigations have highlighted the impact that strabismus may typically have on quality of life. Studies in which subjects were shown images of strabismic and non-strabismic persons showed a strong negative bias towards those visibly displaying the condition, clearly demonstrating the potential for future socioeconomic implications with regard to employability, as well as other psychosocial effects related to an individual's overall happiness.

Adult and child observers perceived a right heterotropia as more disturbing than a left heterotropia, and child observers perceived an esotropia as "worse" than an exotropia. Successful surgical correction of strabismus, for adult as well as children, has been shown to have a significantly positive effect on psychological well-being.

Very little research exists regarding coping strategies employed by adult strabismics. One study categorized coping methods into three subcategories: avoidance (refraining from participation in an activity), distraction (deflecting attention from the condition), and adjustment (approaching an activity differently). The authors of the study suggested that individuals with strabismus may benefit from psychosocial support such as interpersonal skills training. No studies have evaluated whether psychosocial interventions have had any benefits on individuals undergoing strabismus surgery.

== Pathophysiology ==
The extraocular muscles control the position of the eyes. Thus, a problem with the muscles or the nerves controlling them can cause paralytic strabismus. The extraocular muscles are controlled by cranial nerves III, IV, and VI. An impairment of cranial nerve III causes the associated eye to deviate down and out and may or may not affect the size of the pupil. Impairment of cranial nerve IV, which can be congenital, causes the associated eye to drift up and perhaps slightly inward. Sixth nerve palsy causes the associated eye to deviate inward and has many causes due to the relatively long path of the nerve. Increased cranial pressure can compress the nerve as it runs between the clivus and brain stem.

Evidence indicates a cause for strabismus may lie with the input provided to the visual cortex. If a great difference in clarity occurs between the images from the right and left eyes, input may be insufficient to correctly reposition the eyes. Other causes of a visual difference between right and left eyes, such as asymmetrical cataracts, refractive error, or other eye disease, can also cause or worsen strabismus.

== Diagnosis ==
During an eye examination, a test such as cover testing or the Hirschberg test is used in the diagnosis and measurement of strabismus and its impact on vision. Retinal birefringence scanning can be used for screening of young children for eye misalignment. A Cochrane review to examine different types of diagnosis test found only one study. This study used a photoscreener which was found to have high specificity (accurate in identifying those without the condition) but low sensitivity (inaccurate in identifying those with the condition).

Several classifications are made when diagnosing strabismus.

=== Latency ===
Strabismus can be manifest (-tropia) or latent (-phoria). A manifest deviation, or heterotropia (which may be eso-, exo-, hyper-, hypo-, cyclotropia or a combination of these), is present while the person views a target binocularly, with no occlusion of either eye. The person is unable to align the gaze of each eye to achieve fusion. A latent deviation, or heterophoria (eso-, exo-, hyper-, hypo-, cyclophoria or a combination of these), is only present after binocular vision has been interrupted, typically by covering one eye. This type of person can typically maintain fusion despite the misalignment that occurs when the positioning system is relaxed. Intermittent strabismus is a combination of both of these types, where the person can achieve fusion, but occasionally or frequently falters to the point of a manifest deviation.

=== Onset ===
Strabismus may also be classified based on time of onset, either congenital, acquired, or secondary to another pathological process. Many infants are born with their eyes slightly misaligned, and this is typically outgrown by six to 12 months of age. Acquired and secondary strabismus develop later. The onset of accommodative esotropia, an overconvergence of the eyes due to the effort of accommodation, is mostly in early childhood. Acquired non-accommodative strabismus and secondary strabismus are developed after normal binocular vision has developed. In adults with previously normal alignment, the onset of strabismus usually results in double vision.

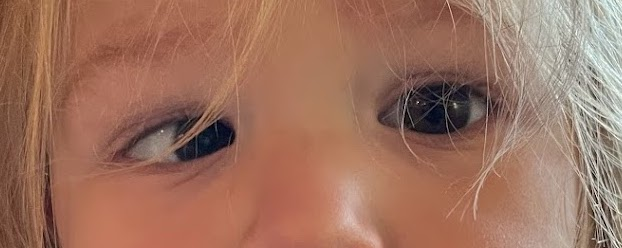
A child with accommodative esotropia affecting the right eye

Any disease that causes vision loss may also cause strabismus, but it can also result from any severe and/or traumatic injury to the affected eye. Sensory strabismus is strabismus due to vision loss or impairment, leading to horizontal, vertical or torsional misalignment or to a combination thereof, with the eye with poorer vision drifting slightly over time. Most often, the outcome is horizontal misalignment. Its direction depends on the person's age at which the damage occurs: people whose vision is lost or impaired at birth are more likely to develop esotropia, whereas people with acquired vision loss or impairment mostly develop exotropia. In the extreme, complete blindness in one eye generally leads to the blind eye reverting to an anatomical position of rest.

Although many possible causes of strabismus are known, among them severe and/or traumatic injuries to the affected eye, in many cases no specific cause can be identified. This last is typically the case when strabismus is present since early childhood.

Results of a U.S. cohort study indicate that the incidence of adult-onset strabismus increases with age, especially after the sixth decade of life, and peaks in the eighth decade of life, and that the lifetime risk of being diagnosed with adult-onset strabismus is approximately 4%.

=== Laterality ===
Strabismus may be classified as unilateral if the one eye consistently deviates, or alternating if either of the eyes can be seen to deviate. Alternation of the strabismus may occur spontaneously, with or without subjective awareness of the alternation. Alternation may also be triggered by various tests during an eye exam. Unilateral strabismus has been observed to result from a severe or traumatic injury to the affected eye.

=== Direction and latency ===
Horizontal deviations are classified into two varieties, using prefixes: eso- describes inward or convergent deviations towards the midline, while exo- describes outward or divergent misalignment. Vertical deviations are also classified into two varieties, using prefixes: hyper- is the term for an eye whose gaze is directed higher than the fellow eye, while hypo- refers to an eye whose gaze is directed lower. Finally, the prefix cyclo- refers to torsional strabismus, which occurs when the eyes rotate around the anterior–posterior axis to become misaligned and is quite rare.

These five directional prefixes are combined with -tropia (if manifest) or -phoria (if latent) to describe various types of strabismus. For example, a constant left hypertropia exists when a person's left eye is always aimed higher than the right. A person with an intermittent right esotropia has a right eye that occasionally drifts toward the person's nose, but at other times is able to align with the gaze of the left eye. A person with a mild exophoria can maintain fusion during normal circumstances, but when the system is disrupted, the relaxed posture of the eyes is slightly divergent.

=== Other considerations ===
Strabismus can be further classified as follows:

- Paretic strabismus is due to paralysis of one or several extraocular muscles.
- Nonparetic strabismus is not due to paralysis of extraocular muscles.
- Comitant (or concomitant) strabismus is a deviation that is the same magnitude regardless of gaze position.
- Noncomitant (or incomitant) strabismus has a magnitude that varies as the person shifts his or her gaze up, down, or to the sides.

Nonparetic strabismus is generally concomitant. Most types of infant and childhood strabismus are comitant. Paretic strabismus can be either comitant or noncomitant. Incomitant strabismus is almost always caused by a limitation of ocular rotations that is due to a restriction of extraocular eye movement (ocular restriction) or due to extraocular muscle paresis. Incomitant strabismus cannot be fully corrected by prism glasses, because the eyes would require different degrees of prismatic correction dependent on the direction of the gaze. Incomitant strabismus of the eso- or exo-type are classified as "alphabet patterns": they are denoted as A- or V- or more rarely λ-, Y- or X-pattern depending on the extent of convergence or divergence when the gaze moves upward or downward. These letters of the alphabet denote ocular motility pattern that have a similarity to the respective letter: in the A-pattern there is (relatively speaking) more convergence when the gaze is directed upwards and more divergence when it is directed downwards, in the V-pattern it is the contrary, in the λ-, Y- and X-patterns there is little or no strabismus in the middle position but relatively more divergence in one or both of the upward and downward positions, depending on the "shape" of the letter. Such strabismus is therefore also called incomitant pattern strabismus (or pattern strabismus). A further type is the diamond-pattern strabismus, also denoted as <>-pattern, in which a relative convergence of the eyes is seen in both upgaze and downgaze.

Types of incomitant strabismus include: Duane syndrome, horizontal gaze palsy, and congenital fibrosis of the extraocular muscles.

When the misalignment of the eyes is large and obvious, the strabismus is called large-angle, referring to the angle of deviation between the lines of sight of the eyes. Less severe eye turns are called small-angle strabismus. The degree of strabismus can vary based on whether the person is viewing a distant or near target.

Strabismus that sets in after eye alignment had been surgically corrected is called consecutive strabismus.

=== Differential diagnosis ===
Pseudostrabismus is the false appearance of strabismus. It generally occurs in infants and toddlers whose bridge of the nose is wide and flat, causing the appearance of esotropia due to less sclera being visible nasally. With age, the bridge of the child's nose narrows and the folds in the corner of the eyes become less prominent.

Retinoblastoma may also result in abnormal light reflection from the eye.

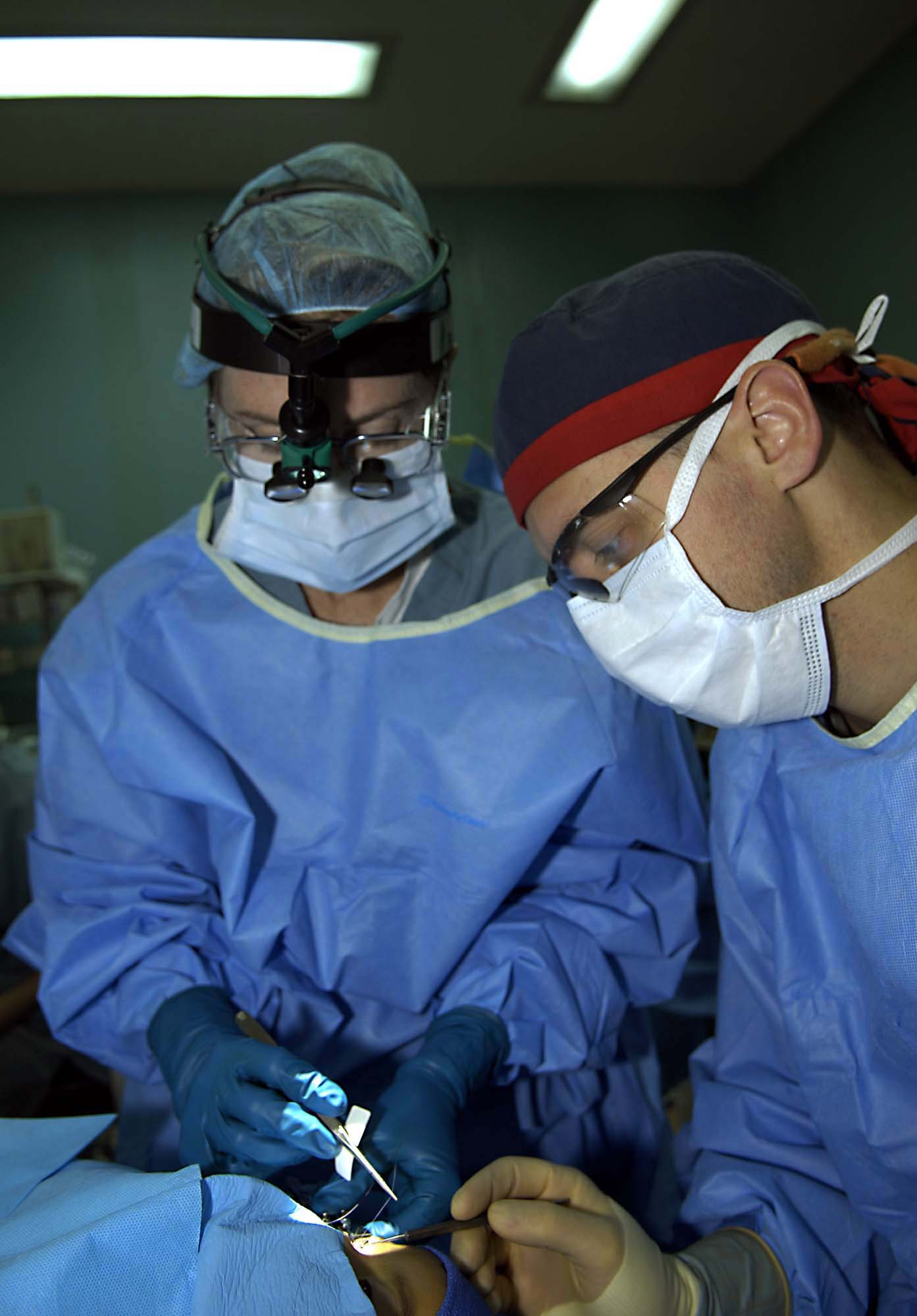
Strabismus correction surgery

== Management ==
Strabismus is usually treated with a combination of eyeglasses, vision therapy, and surgery, depending on the underlying reason for the misalignment. As with other binocular vision disorders, the primary goal is comfortable, single, clear, normal binocular vision at all distances and directions of gaze.

=== Glasses ===
In cases of accommodative esotropia, the eyes turn inward due to the effort of focusing far-sighted eyes, and the treatment of this type of strabismus necessarily involves refractive correction, which is usually done via corrective glasses or contact lenses, and in these cases surgical alignment is considered only if such correction does not resolve the eye turn.

In case of strong anisometropia, contact lenses may be preferable to spectacles because they avoid the problem of visual disparities due to size differences (aniseikonia) which is otherwise caused by spectacles in which the refractive power is very different for the two eyes. In a few cases of strabismic children with anisometropic amblyopia, a balancing of the refractive error eyes via refractive surgery has been performed before strabismus surgery was undertaken.

Early treatment of strabismus when the person is a baby may reduce the chance of developing amblyopia and depth perception problems. However, a review of randomized controlled trials concluded that the use of corrective glasses to prevent strabismus is not supported by existing research. Amblyopia has long been considered to remain permanent if not treated within a critical period, namely before the age of about seven years.

Glasses affect the position by changing the person's reaction to focusing. Prisms change the way light, and therefore images, strike the eye, simulating a change in the eye position.

=== Surgery ===
Strabismus surgery does not remove the need for a child to wear glasses. Currently it is unknown whether there are any differences for completing strabismus surgery before or after amblyopia therapy in children.

Strabismus surgery attempts to align the eyes by shortening, lengthening, or changing the position of one or more of the extraocular eye muscles. The procedure can typically be performed in about an hour, and requires about six to eight weeks for recovery. Adjustable sutures may be used to permit refinement of the eye alignment in the early postoperative period. It is unclear if there are differences between adjustable versus non-adjustable sutures as it has not been sufficiently studied. An alternative to the classical procedure is minimally invasive strabismus surgery (MISS) that uses smaller incisions than usual.

=== Medication ===
Medication is used for strabismus in certain circumstances. In 1989, the US FDA approved botulinum toxin therapy for strabismus in people over 12 years old. Most commonly used in adults, the technique is also used for treating children, in particular children affected by infantile esotropia. The toxin is injected in the stronger muscle, causing temporary and partial paralysis. The treatment may need to be repeated three to four months later once the paralysis wears off. Common side effects are double vision, droopy eyelid, overcorrection, and no effect. The side effects typically resolve also within three to four months. Botulinum toxin therapy has been reported to be similarly successful as strabismus surgery for people with binocular vision and less successful than surgery for those who have no binocular vision.

== Prognosis ==
When strabismus is congenital or develops in infancy, it can cause amblyopia, in which the brain ignores input from the deviated eye. Even with therapy for amblyopia, stereoblindness may occur. The appearance of strabismus may also be a cosmetic problem. One study reported 85% of adults with strabismus "reported that they had problems with work, school, and sports because of their strabismus." The same study also reported 70% said strabismus "had a negative effect on their self-image." A second operation is sometimes required to straighten the eyes.

== In other animals ==
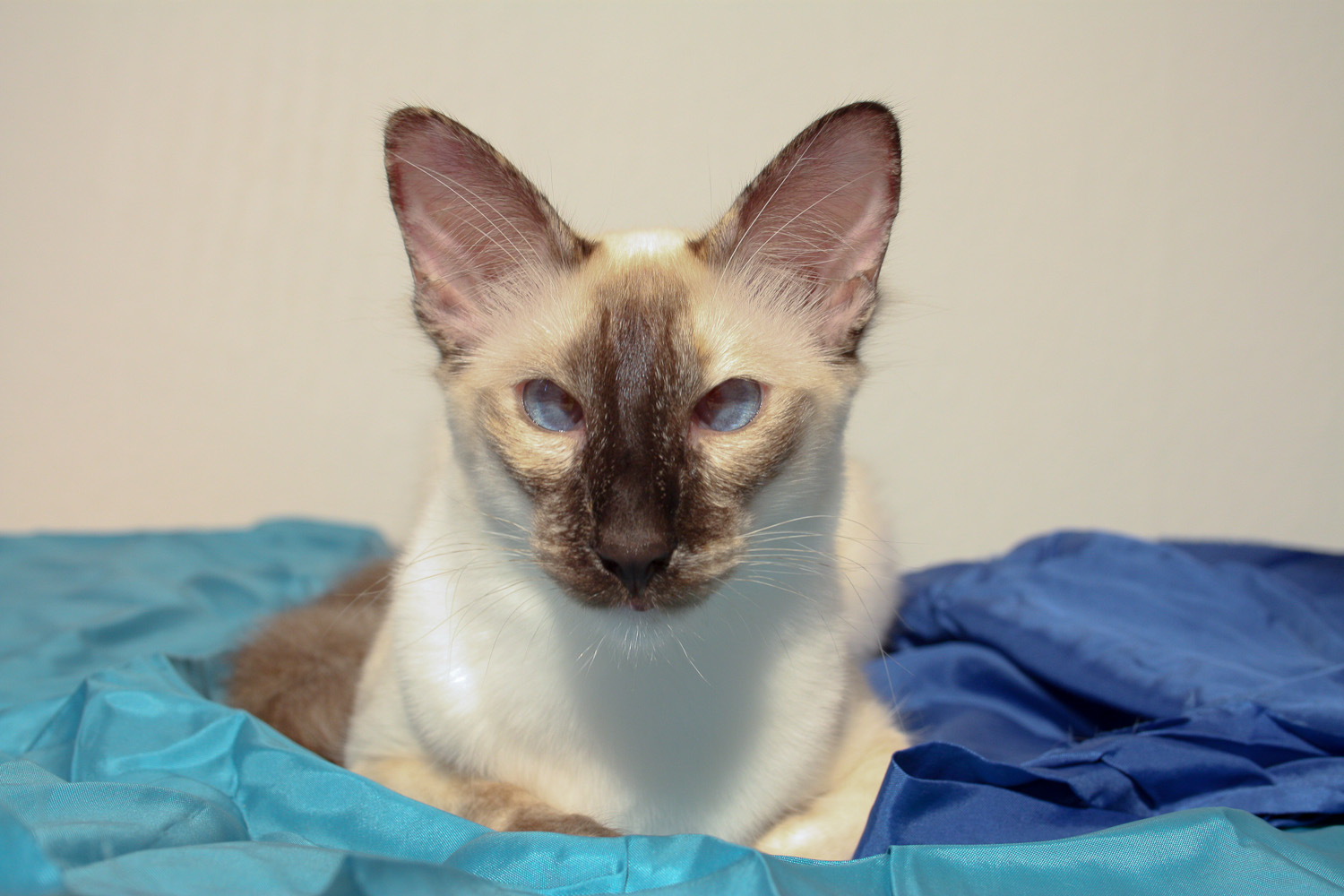
A Balinese cat exhibiting esotropia

Siamese cats and related breeds are prone to having crossed eyes. Research suggests this is a behavioral compensation for developmental abnormalities in the routing of nerves in the optic chiasm.

Strabismus may also occur in dogs, most often due to imbalanced muscle tone of the muscles surrounding the eye. Some breeds such as the Shar Pei are genetically predisposed to the condition. Treatment may involve surgery or therapy to strengthen the muscles.
