= Aniseikonia =

Difference in the perceived size of eye images

- Specialty: Ophthalmology
- Symptoms: objects different sizes in each eye
- Causes: Cataract surgery, refractive surgery

Aniseikonia is an ocular condition where there is a significant difference in the perceived size of images. It can occur as an overall difference between the two eyes, or as a difference in a particular meridian. If the ocular image size in both eyes are equal, the condition is known as iseikonia.

== Symptoms and signs ==
Up to 7% difference in image size is well tolerated. If magnification difference becomes excessive the effect can cause diplopia, suppression, disorientation, eyestrain, headache, and dizziness and balance disorders. Asthenopic symptoms alone may occur even if image size difference is less than 7%.

== Causes ==
Retinal image size is determined by many factors. The size and position of the object being viewed affects the characteristics of the light entering the system. Corrective lenses affect these characteristics and are used commonly to correct refractive error. The optics of the eye including its refractive power and axial length also play a major role in retinal image size.

Aniseikonia can occur naturally or be induced by the correction of a refractive error, usually anisometropia (having significantly different refractive errors between each eye) or antimetropia (being myopic (nearsighted) in one eye and hyperopic (farsighted) in the other.) Meridional aniseikonia occurs when these refractive differences only occur in one meridian (see astigmatism).

One cause of significant anisometropia and subsequent aniseikonia has been aphakia. Aphakic patients do not have a crystalline lens. The crystalline lens is often removed because of opacities called cataracts. The absence of this lens left the patient highly hyperopic (farsighted) in that eye. For some patients the removal was only performed on one eye, resulting in the anisometropia / aniseikonia. Today, this is rarely a problem because when the lens is removed in cataract surgery, an intraocular lens, or IOL is left in its place.

Retinal aniseikonia occur due to forward displacement, stretching or edema of retina.

== Diagnosis ==
A way to demonstrate aniseikonia is to hold a near target (e.g., a pen or a finger) approximately 6 inches directly in front of one eye. The person then closes one eye, and then the other. The person should notice that the target appears larger to the eye that it is directly in front of. When this object is viewed with both eyes, it is seen with a small amount of aniseikonia. The principles behind this demonstration are relative distance magnification (closer objects appear larger) and asymmetrical convergence (the target is not an equal distance from each eye).

== Treatment ==
Optical aniseikonia due to anisometropia can be corrected by spectacles, contact lenses or refractive corneal surgeries.

Spectacle correction is done by changing the optical magnification properties of the auxiliary optics (corrective lenses). The optical magnification properties of spectacle lenses can be adjusted by changing parameters like the base curve, vertex distance, and center thickness. Magnification size matched lenses that are used to correct aniseikonia are known as iseikonic lenses.

Contact lenses may also provide less difference in retinal image size. Wider and better field of vision is another benefit of contact lens use. The difference in magnification can also be eliminated by a combination of contact lenses and glasses (creating a weak telescope system). The optimum design solution will depend on different parameters like cost, cosmetic implications, and if the patient can tolerate wearing a contact lens.

For reducing aniseikonia, similar to contact lens correction, optical image size difference will be reduced in refractive surgeries also.

Aniseikonia due to uniocular aphakia is best corrected surgically by intraocular lens implantation. Similarly retinal aniseikonia is corrected by treating causative retinal disease.

Note however that before the optics can be designed, first the aniseikonia should be measured. When the image disparity is astigmatic (cylindrical) and not uniform, images can appear wider, taller, or diagonally different. When the disparity appears to vary across the visual field (field-dependent aniseikonia), as may be the case with an epiretinal membrane or retinal detachment, the aniseikonia cannot fully be corrected with traditional optical techniques like standard corrective lenses. However, partial correction often improves the patient's vision comfort significantly.

== Etymology ==
The word "aniseikonia" is derived from the following Greek morphemes:

- "an" = "not" (as in "anæmia");
- "is(o)" = "equal" (as in "isobar");
- "eikōn" = "image" (as in "icon").

== See also ==
- Adelbert Ames, Jr.
- Anisometropia
- Macropsia
- Micropsia
