= Frederick W. Brock =

Swiss optometrist

Frederick W. Brock (1899–1972), born in Switzerland, was an optometrist, a major contributor to vision therapy, and the inventor of various vision therapy devices including the Brock string. Brock's approach to treating eye disorders was crucial in paving the way to overcoming an erroneous but long-standing medical consensus that stereopsis could not be acquired in adulthood but only during a critical period early in life: neuroscientist Susan R. Barry, the first person to have received widespread media attention for having acquired stereo vision in adulthood, attributes him a central role in her recovery of stereopsis, a discovery which in turn influenced the prevalent scientific conceptions with regard to the neuroplasticity of the visual system.

== Working method ==
Brock made many contributions to vision therapy, and his work focussed mainly on the application of vision training to the diagnosis and therapy of binocular dysfunction.

Brock trained his patients with rich stereo images which closely resembled the natural environment, and favored these over the use of (simplified) stereographs. In a first session with a client, Brock would invest great time into finding a point at which the client already performed binocular fusion, and Brock would refer to this point as his "point of attack" from which he would try to expand the range of positions in which fusion was achieved. He made use of the peripheral vision of his patients to lock binocular fusion, using his so-called "stereomotivator" to project large red/green anaglyphic stereo images onto a wall such as to stimulate very large receptive fields in the patients. He spoke against the use of an amblyoscope during training, because in his view the patient needed to take the correct binocular posture (aiming the two eyes such that they simultaneously look at the same target in space) when fusing, otherwise the training would not be likely to succeed.

Aside the well-known Brock string with which patients practice binocular accommodation and vergence, he frequently used images of red/green anaglyphic rings for diagnosis and training.

== Influence ==
Brock's methods have been widely applied in vision therapy.

Susan Barry's vision therapist Theresa Ruggiero used Brock's methods and approach in her own vision therapy sessions. Her therapy led Barry to achieve stereo vision, disproving the medical community's consensus that stereo vision in adult life was inachievable.

Barry later wrote a paper on Brock's work that was selected as the best published paper in the Journal of Behavioral Optometry in 2011.

== Personal life ==
Born in Switzerland in 1899, Brock spoke German at first, but switched to English as his main language after he moved to the United States in 1921 at the age of 22. He saw an analogy between such a transition of languages and the mental transition that is required of a strabismic person. He had some own experience with the strabismic way of seeing, reportedly having had brief moments of intermittent diplopia himself. For most of his professional career, he practiced in Staten Island, NY.

Brock published more than 100 papers, journals, manuals, monographs and lecture notes.

The Frederick W. Brock Memorial Award for Excellence in Vision Therapy is awarded in his honor.
