= Stereopsis recovery =

Medical phenomenon

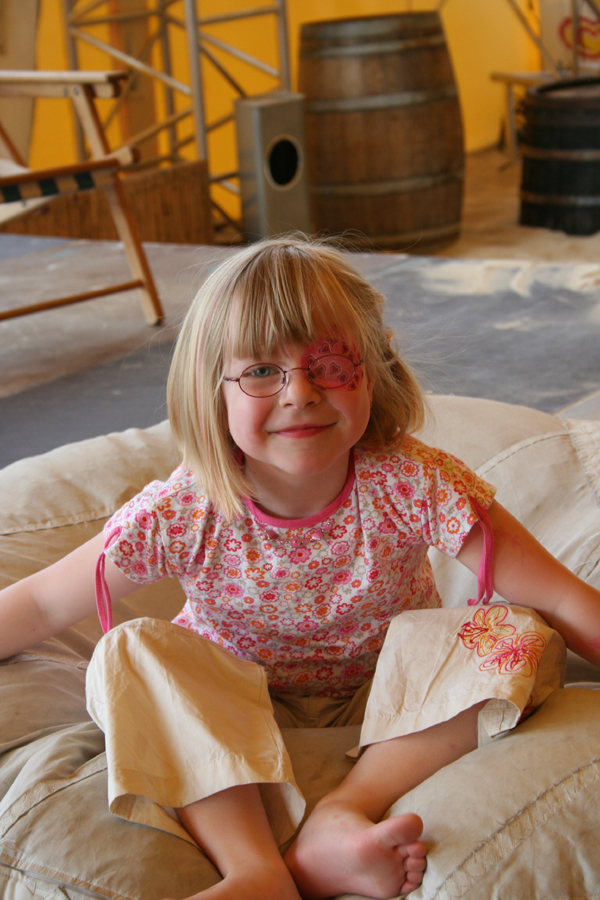
Eye patches may strengthen the weaker eye but fail to stimulate binocular vision and stereopsis, which may sometimes be recovered by different means.

Stereopsis recovery, also recovery from stereoblindness, is the phenomenon of a stereoblind person gaining partial or full ability of stereo vision (stereopsis).

Recovering stereo vision as far as possible has long been established as an approach to the therapeutic treatment of stereoblind patients. Treatment aims to recover stereo vision in very young children, as well as in patients who had acquired but lost their ability for stereopsis due to a medical condition. In contrast, this aim has normally not been present in the treatment of those who missed out on learning stereopsis during their first few years of life. In fact, the acquisition of binocular and stereo vision was long thought to be impossible unless the person acquired this skill during a critical period in infancy and early childhood. This hypothesis normally went unquestioned and has formed the basis for the therapeutic approaches to binocular disorders for decades. It has been put in doubt in recent years. In particular since studies on stereopsis recovery began to appear in scientific journals and it became publicly known that neuroscientist Susan R. Barry achieved stereopsis well into adulthood, that assumption is in retrospect considered to have held the status of a scientific dogma.

Very recently, there has been a rise in scientific investigations into stereopsis recovery in adults and youths who have had no stereo vision before. While it has now been shown that an adult may gain stereopsis, it is currently not yet possible to predict how likely a stereoblind person is to do so, nor is there general agreement on the best therapeutic procedure. The possible implications for the treatment of children with infantile esotropia are still under study.

== Clinical management of strabismus and stereoblindness ==
In cases of acquired strabismus with double vision (diplopia), it is long-established state of the art to aim at curing the double vision and at the same time recovering a patient's earlier ability for stereo vision. For example, a patient may have had full stereo vision but later had diplopia due to a medical condition, losing stereo vision. In this case, medical interventions, including vision therapy and strabismus surgery, may remove the double vision and recover the stereo vision which had temporarily been absent in the patient.

When children with congenital (infantile) strabismus (e.g. infantile esotropia) receive strabismus surgery at an early stage, this goes along with the hope that they may yet develop their full potential for binocular vision including stereopsis: A recent study concluded that quality of stereopsis and binocular vision may benefit from surgery being performed within six months of the onset of infantile esotropia, and this concerned both the amount of high-grade stereopsis achieved in some children and the overall percentage of children developing any stereopsis at all.

In contrast, in a case where a child's eyes are straightened surgically after the age of about five or six years and the child had no opportunity to develop stereo vision in early childhood, normally the clinical expectation is that this intervention will lead to cosmetic improvements but not to stereo vision. Conventionally, no follow-up for stereopsis was performed in such cases.

For instance, one author summarized the accepted scientific view of the time with the words: "Stereopsis will never be obtained unless amblyopia is treated, the eyes are aligned, and binocular fusion and function are achieved before the critical period for stereopsis ends. Clinical data suggest that this occurs before 24 months of age,[...] but we do not know exactly when it occurs, because crucial pieces of basic science information are missing." For purposes of illustration, reference is made to a book of doctors' handouts for patients, written for the general public and published in 2002, which summarizes the limitations in the terms in which they, at the time, were fully accepted as medical state of the art as follows: "If an adult has a childhood strabismus that was never treated, it is too late to improve any amblyopia or depth perception, so the goal may be simply cosmetic – to make the eyes appear to be properly aligned – though sometimes treatment does enlarge the extent of side vision." It has only been accepted very recently that the therapeutic approach was based on an unquestioned notion that has, since, been referred to as "myth" or "dogma".

Recently, however, stereopsis recovery is known to have occurred in a number of adults. While this has in some cases occurred after visual exercises or spontaneous visual experiences, recently also the medical community's view of strabismus surgery has become more optimistic with regard to outcomes in terms of binocular function and possibly stereopsis. As one author states:

The majority of adults will experience some improvement in binocular function after strabismus surgery even if the strabismus has been longstanding. Most commonly this takes the form of an expansion of binocular visual fields; however, some patients may also regain stereopsis.

Scientific investigations on residual neural plasticity in adulthood now also include studies on the recovery of stereopsis. Now it is a matter of active scientific investigation under which conditions and to which degree binocular fusion and stereo vision can be acquired in adulthood, especially if the person is not known to have had any preceding experience of stereo vision, and how outcomes may depend on the patient's history of therapeutic interventions.

== Examples and case studies ==
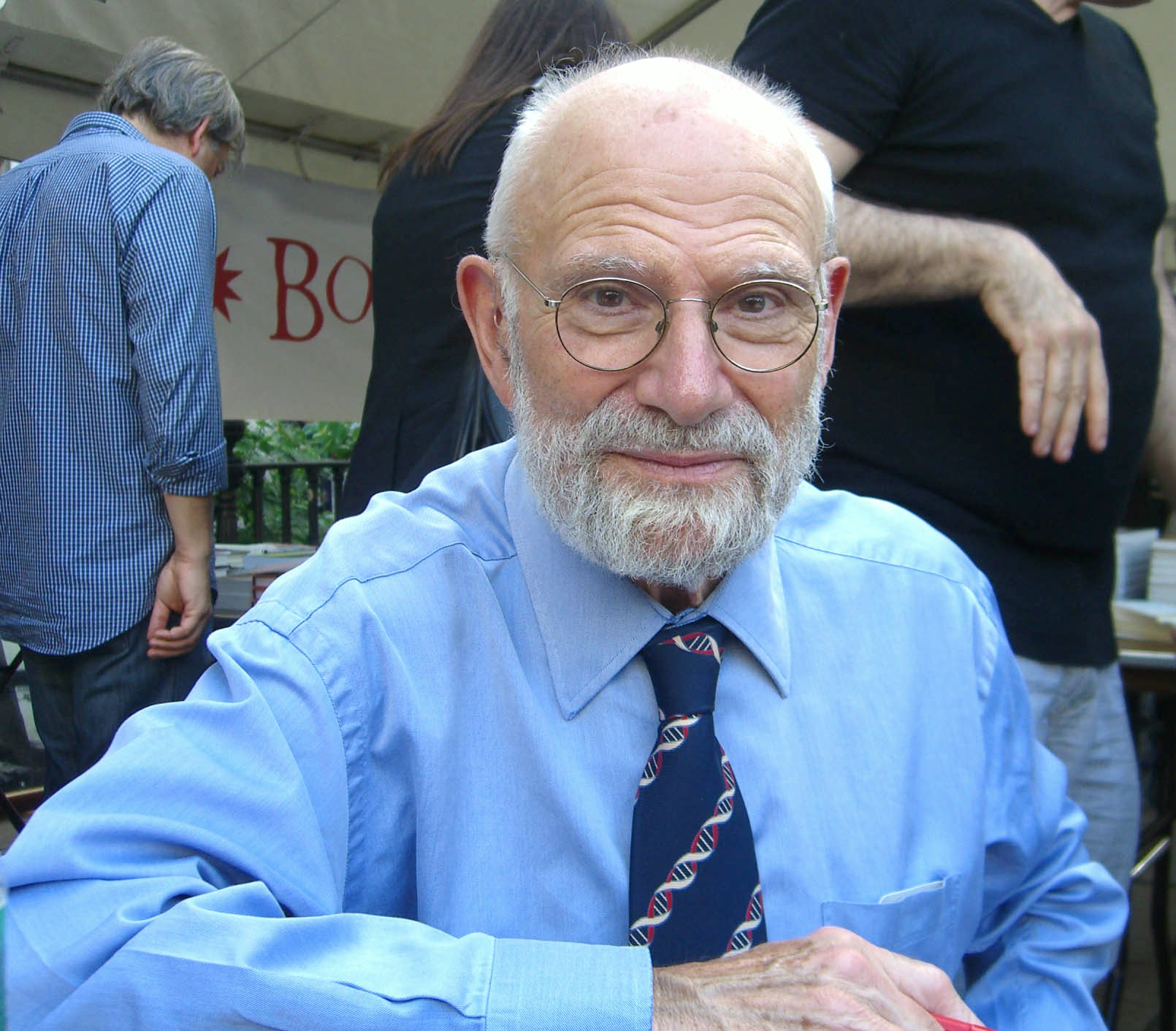
Oliver Sacks was the first to make the story of Susan Barry, whom he nicknamed "Stereo Sue", known to the general public.

Stereopsis recovery has been reported to have occurred in a few adults as a result of either medical treatments including strabismus surgery and vision therapy, or spontaneously after a stereoscopic 3D cinema experience, or subsequent to surgery in cases of horizontal comitant strabismus.

=== Personal reports in Fixing my Gaze ===
The most renowned case of regained stereopsis is that of neuroscientist Susan R. Barry, who had had alternating infantile esotropia with diplopia, but no amblyopia, underwent three surgical corrections in childhood without achieving binocular vision at the time, and recovered from stereoblindness in adult age after vision therapy with optometrist Theresa Ruggiero. Barry's case has been reported on by neurologist Oliver Sacks. Also David H. Hubel, winner of the 1981 Nobel Prize in Physiology or Medicine with Torsten Wiesel for their discoveries concerning information processing in the visual system, commented positively on her case. In 2009, Barry published a book Fixing My Gaze: A Scientist's Journey into Seeing in Three Dimensions, reporting on her own and several other cases of stereopsis recovery.

In her book Fixing my Gaze, Susan Barry gives a detailed description of her surprise, elation and subsequent experiences when her stereo vision suddenly set in when driving home after a vision therapy session with a Brock string.

The sun was setting as I left Dr. Ruggerio's office after the long session with the Brock string. I got into my car, sat down in the driver's seat, placed the key in the ignition, and glanced at the steering wheel. It was an ordinary steering wheel against an ordinary dashboard, but it took on a whole new dimension that day. The steering wheel was floating in its own space, with a palpable volume of empty space between the wheel and the dashboard. […] I wondered if I as seen in stereoscopic depth but reminded myself that this should not be possible. […] The next morning I practiced the Broack string procedure for ten minutes before getting in the car […]. As I looked up to adjust the rearview mirror, the mirror popped out at me […]. Throughout the day, my stereo vision would emerge – intermittently, fleetingly, unexpectedly – bringing me moments of absolute wonder and delight.

Hubel wrote of her book:

"It has been widely thought that an adult, cross-eyed since infancy, could never acquire stereovision, but to everyone's surprise, Barry succeeded. In Fixing my Gaze, she describes how wonderful it was to have, step-by-step, this new 3D world revealed to her. And as a neurobiologist she is able to discuss the science as an expert, in simple language."

— David H. Hubel, winner of the Nobel Prize in Physiology/Medicine, John Franklin Enders Professor of Neurobiology, Emeritus, Harvard Medical School.

Her book includes reports of further persons who have had similar experiences with stereopsis recovery. Barry cites the personal experiences of several persons, including a man who was an artist and described his experience of seeing with stereopsis as "that he could see one hundred more times negative space", a woman who had been amblyopic before seeing in 3D described how empty space now "looks and feels palpable, tangible—alive!", a woman who had been strabismic since age two and saw in 3D after taking vision therapy and stated that "The coolest thing is the feeling you get being 'in the dimension'", a woman who felt quite alarmed at the experience of suddenly seeing roadside trees and signs looming towards her, and two women who experienced an abrupt onset of stereo vision with a wide-angled view of the world, the first stating: "I was able to take in so much more of the room than I did before" and the second: "It was very dramatic as my peripheral vision suddenly filled in on both sides".

Common to Barry and at least one person on whom she had reported is the finding that also their mental representation of space changed after having acquired stereo vision: that even with one eye closed the feeling is to see "more" than seeing with one eye closed before recovering stereopsis.

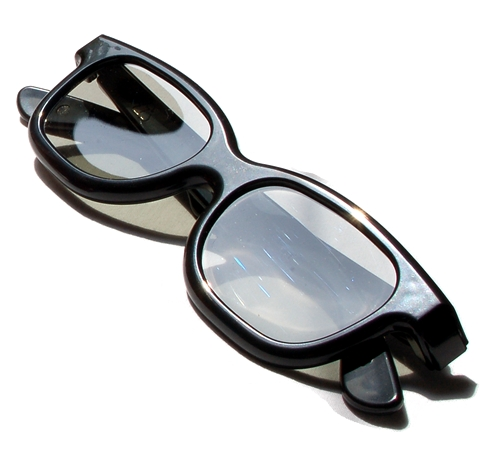
Although stereoblind, Bridgeman used polarized glasses in a 3D cinema and could suddenly see in 3D.

=== Further cases in the media ===
Apart from Barry, another formerly stereoblind adult whose acquired ability for stereopsis has received media attention is neuroscientist Bruce Bridgeman, professor of psychology and psychobiology at University of California Santa Cruz, who had grown up nearly stereoblind and acquired stereo vision spontaneously in 2012 at the age of 67, when watching the 3D movie Hugo with polarizing 3D glasses. The scene suddenly appeared to him in depth, and the ability to see the world in stereo stayed with him also after leaving the cinema.

=== Other first person accounts ===
Michael Thomas has described the experience of instantaneous onset of three dimensional vision at the age of 69 in a Public Facebook post.

== Recent scientific investigations ==
There is a growing recent body of scientific literature on investigations into the recovery of stereopsis in adults which started to appear shortly before Oliver Sacks' The New Yorker publication drew public attention to Barry's discovery. A number of scientific publications have systematically assessed patients' post-surgical stereopsis, whereas other studies have investigated the effects of eye training procedures.

=== Post-surgical stereopsis ===
Certain conditions are known to be a prerequisite for stereo vision, for instance, that the amount of horizontal deviation, if any is present, needs to be small. In several studies it has been recognized that surgery to correct strabismus can have the effect of improving binocular function. One of these studies, published in 2003, explicitly concluded: "We found that improvement in binocularity, including stereopsis, can be obtained in a substantial portion of adults." That article was published together with a discussion of the results among peers in which the scientific and social implications of the medical treatment were addressed, for example concerning the long-term relevancy of stereopsis, the importance of avoiding diplopia, the necessity of predictable outcomes, and psychosocial and socioeconomic relevance.

Among the investigations into post-surgical stereopsis is a publication of 2005 that reported on a total of 43 adults over 18 years of age who had surgical correction after having lived with from constant-horizontal strabismus for more than 10 years with no previous surgery or stereopsis, with visual acuity of 20/40 or more also in the deviating eye; in this group, stereopsis was present in 80% of exotropes and 31% of esotropes, with the recovery of stereopsis and stereoacuity being uncorrelated to the number of years the deviation had persisted. A study that was published 2006 included, aside an extensive review of investigations on stereopsis recovery of the last decades, a re-evaluation of all those patients who had had congenital or early-onset strabismus with a large constant horizontal divergence and had undergone strabismus surgery in the years 1997–1999 in a given clinic, excluding those who had a history of neurologic or systemic diseases or with organic retinal diseases. Among the resulting 36 subjects aged 6–30 years, many had regained binocular vision (56% according to an evaluation with Bagolini striated glasses, 39% with Titmus test, 33% with Worth 4-dot test, and 22% with Random dot E test) and 57% had stereoacuity of 200 sec of arc of better, leading to the conclusion that some degrees of stereopsis can be achieved even in cases of infantile or early-childhood strabism. Another study found that some chronically strabismic adults with good vision could recover fusion and stereopsis by means of surgical alignment.

In contrast, in a study in which a group of 17 adults and older children of at least 8 years of age, all of whom received strabismus surgery and post-operative evaluation after long-standing untreated infantile esotropia, most showed binocular fusion when tested with Bagolini lenses and an increased visual field, but none demonstrated stereo fusion or stereopsis.

Stereoacuity is limited by the visual acuity of the eyes, and in particular by the visual acuity of the weaker eye. That is, the more a patient's vision of any one of the two eyes is degraded compared to the 20/20 vision standard, the lower are the prospects of improving or re-gaining stereo vision, unless visual acuity itself were improved by other means. Strabismus surgery itself does not improve visual acuity.

=== Stereopsis following training procedures ===
Orthoptic exercises have proven to be effective for reducing symptoms in patients with convergence insufficiency and decompensating exophoria by improving the near-point convergence of the eyes that is necessary for binocular fusion.

Experiments on monkeys, published 2007, revealed improvements in stereoacuity in monkeys who, after having been raised with binocular deprivation through prisms for the first two years, were exposed to extensive psychophysical training. Their stereo vision recovered in part, but remained far more limited than that of normally raised monkeys.

Scientists at the University of California, Berkeley have stated that perceptual learning appears to play an important role. One investigation, published 2011, reported on a study on human stereopsis recovery using perceptual learning which was inspired by Barry's work. In this study, a small number of stereoblind subjects who had initially been stereoblind or stereoanomalous recovered stereopsis using perceptual learning exercises. Alongside the scientific assessment of the extent of recovery, also the subjective outcomes are described:

After achieving stereopsis, our observers reported that the depth "popped out", which they found very helpful and joyful in their everyday life. The anisometropic observer GD noticed "a surge in depth" one day when shopping in a supermarket. While playing table tennis, she feels that she is able to track a ping-pong ball more accurately and therefore can play better. Strabismic observer AB is more confident now when walking down stairs because she can judge the depth of the steps better. Strabismics AB, DP, and LR, are able to enjoy 3D movies for the first time, and strabismic GJ finds it easier to catch a fly ball while playing baseball.

In a follow-up study, the authors of this study pointed out that the stereopsis that was recovered following perceptual learning was more limited in resolution and precision compared to normal subjects' stereopsis. Dennis M. Levi was awarded the 2011 Charles F. Prentice Medal of the American Academy of Optometry for this work.

Tetris is a popular video game from the 1980s. A modified version of the game (not shown here) has been used for dichoptic training.

There have been several attempts to make use of modern technology for enhanced binocular eye training, in particular for treating amblyopia and interocular suppression. In some cases these modern techniques have improved patients' stereoacuity. Very early technology-enhanced vision therapy efforts have included the cheiroscope, which is a haploscope in which left- and or right-eye images can be blended into view over a drawing pad, and the subject may be given a task such as to reproduce a line image presented to one eye. However, historically these approaches were not developed much further and they were not put to widespread use. Recent systems are based on dichoptic presentation of the elements of a video game or virtual reality such that each eye receives different signals of the virtual world that the player's brain must combine in order to play successfully.

One of the earliest systems of this kind has been proposed by a research group in the University of Nottingham with the aim of treating amblyopia, using virtual reality masks or commercially available 3D shutter glasses. The group also has worked to develop perceptual learning training protocols that specifically target the deficit in stereo acuity to allow the recovery of normal stereo function even in adulthood.

Another system of dichoptic presentation for binocular vision therapy has been proposed by researchers of the Research Institute of the McGill University Health Centre. Using a modified puzzle video game Tetris, the interocular suppression of patients with amblyopia was successfully treated with dichotomic training in which certain parameters of the training material were systematically adapted during the course of four weeks. Clinical supervision of such procedures is required to ensure that double vision does not occur. Most of the patients who underwent this treatment gained improved visual acuity of the weaker eye, and some also showed increased stereoacuity. Another study performed at the same institute showed that dichoptic training can be more effective in adults than the more conventional amblyopia treatment of an eye patch. For this investigation, 18 adults played Tetris for one hour each day, half of the group wearing eye patches and the other half playing a dichoptic version of the game. After two weeks, the group who played dichoptically showed a significant improvement of vision in the weaker eye and in stereopsis acuity; the eye patch group had moderate improvements, which increased substantially after they, too, were given the dichoptic training afterwards. Dichoptic-based perceptual learning therapy, presented by means of a head-mounted display, is amenable also to amblyopic children, as it improves both the amblyopic eye's visual acuity and the stereo function. The researchers at McGill University have shown that one to three weeks of playing a dichoptic video game for one to two hours on a hand-held device "can improve acuity and restore binocular function, including stereopsis in adults". Furthermore, it has been suggested that these effect can be enhanced by anodal transcranial direct current stimulation (tDCS).

Together with Levi of the University of California, Berkeley, scientists at the University of Rochester have made further developments in terms of virtual reality computer games which have shown some promise in improving both monocular and binocular vision in human subjects.

Game developer James Blaha, who developed his own crowd-funded version of a dichoptic VR game for the Oculus Rift together with Manish Gupta and is continuing to experiment with the game, experienced stereopsis for the first time using his game. In 2011, two cases of adults with anisometropic amblyopia were reported whose visual acuity and stereoacuity improved due to learning-based therapies. Recent studies have further investigated the effects of VR-based interventions in relation to binocular vision disorders.

There are indications that the suppression of binocularity in amblyopic subjects is due to a suppression mechanism that prevents the amblyopic brain from learning to see. It has been suggested that desuppression and neuroplasticity may be favored by specific conditions that are commonly associated with perceptual learning tasks and video game playing such as a heightened requirement of attention, a prospect of reward, a feeling of enjoyment and a sense of flow.

== Health care policy matters ==
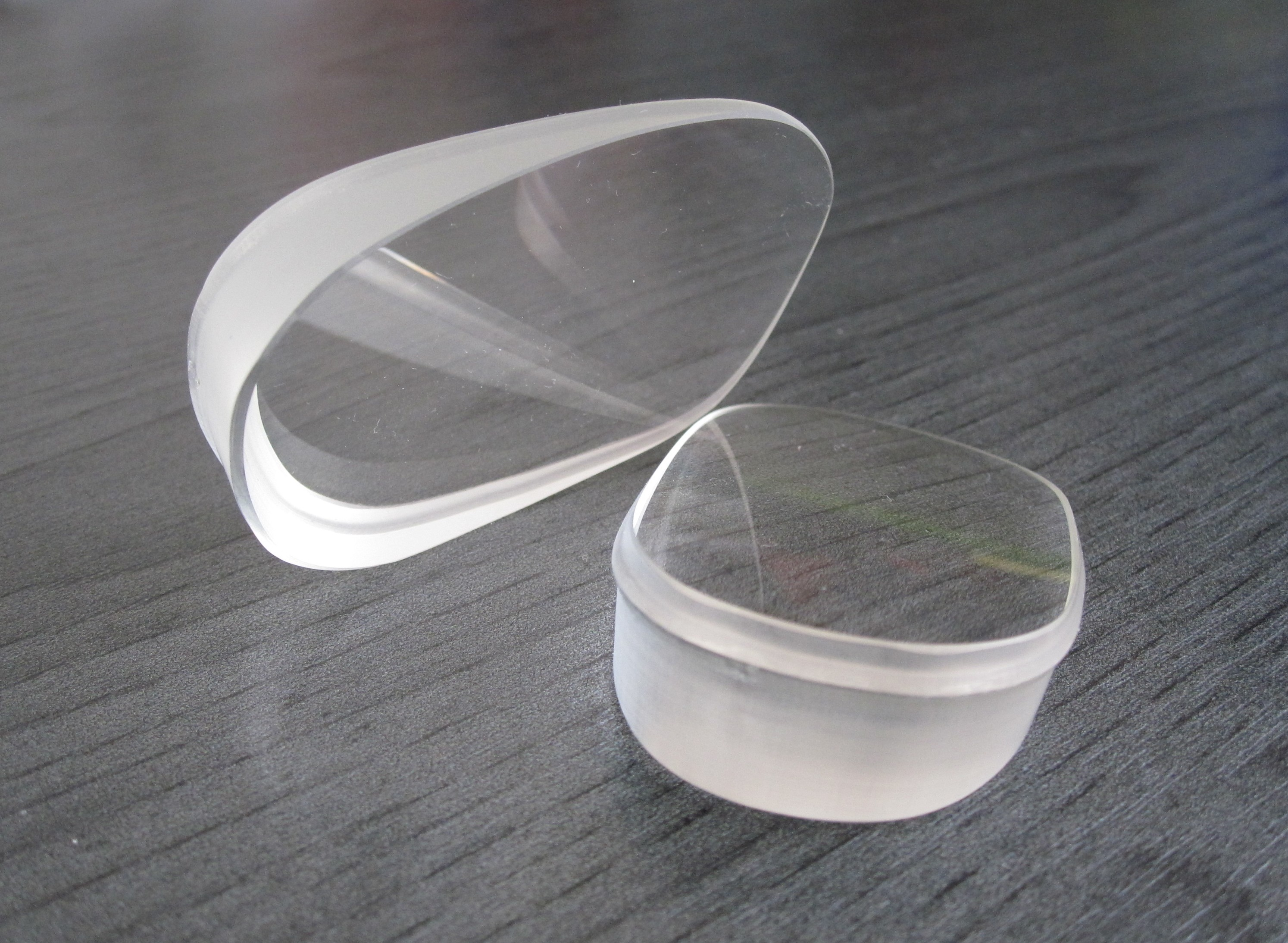
Prism lenses (here unusually thick) are used for pre-operative prism adaptation.

Health insurances always review therapies in terms of clinical effectiveness in view of existing scientific literature, benefit, risk and cost. Even if individual cases of recovery exist, a treatment is only considered effective under this point of view if there is sufficient likelihood that it will predictably improve outcomes.

In this context, medical coverage policy of the global health services organization Cigna "does not cover vision therapy, optometric training, eye exercises or orthoptics because they are considered experimental, investigational or unproven for any indication including the management of visual disorders and learning disabilities" based on a bibliographic review published by Cigna which concludes that "insufficient evidence exists in the published, peer-reviewed literature to conclude that vision therapy is effective for the treatment of any of the strabismic disorders except preoperative prism adaptation for acquired esotropia". Similarly, the U.S. managed health care company Aetna offers vision therapy only in contracts with supplemental coverage and limits its prescriptions to a number of conditions that are explicitly specified in a list of vision disorders.

== See also ==
- Recovery from blindness
