= Susan R. Barry =

American neurobiologist

- Occupation: Professor
- Spouse: Daniel T. Barry

Academic background
- Education: Wesleyan University (B.A.); Princeton University (M.A., PhD)

Academic work
- Discipline: Neurobiology
- Institutions: Mount Holyoke College
- Notable works: Fixing My Gaze: A Scientist's Journey into Seeing in Three Dimensions; Coming to Our Senses: A Boy Who Learned to See, A Girl Who Learned to Hear, and How We All Discover the World; Dear Oliver: An Unexpected Friendship with Oliver Sacks
- Website: Official website

Susan R. Barry is an American neuroscientist, Professor Emeritus at Mount Holyoke College, and the author of three books. She was dubbed Stereo Sue by neurologist and author Oliver Sacks in a 2006 New Yorker article with that name.

Barry's first book greatly expands on Sacks' article and discusses the experience of gaining stereovision through optometric vision therapy, after a lifetime of being stereoblind. It challenges the conventional wisdom that the brain is wired for perceptual skills during a critical period in early childhood and provides evidence instead for neuronal plasticity throughout life. Barry's achievement of stereo vision, with the help of a developmental optometrist Theresa Ruggiero, was reported in a BBC Imagine documentary broadcast on June 28, 2011.

Barry expanded her discussion of sensory plasticity and recovery in her second book, Coming to Our Senses: A Boy Who Learned to See, A Girl Who Learned to Hear, and How We All Discover the World. In it she describes the experiences of Liam McCoy who was practically blind from birth but gained sight at age 15 and Zohra Damji, born profoundly deaf, who learned to hear with a cochlear implant at age 12. The book describes how they each reconstructed and reorganized their perceptual world, reshaped their identity, and rewired the neural circuits in their brain.

In her third book, Dear Oliver, Barry shares her ten-year correspondence with Oliver Sacks. Their shared passions—from classical music to cuttlefish, brain plasticity to bioluminescent plankton—sparked a friendship that buoyed both of them through life’s crests and falls. In a painful twist of fate, as Sue’s vision improved, Oliver’s declined, and his characteristic typed letters shifted to handwritten ones. Sue later recognized this to be an early sign of the cancer that ultimately ended his extraordinary life.

== Education and career ==
Barry graduated from Wesleyan University with a Bachelor of Arts in Biology in 1976. She then did her graduate work at Princeton University, where she earned a Master of Arts in Biology in 1979 and a Ph.D. in Biology in 1981.

She undertook postdoctoral work at the University of Michigan and the University of Miami School of Medicine, and subsequently became assistant professor at the department of Physical Medicine and Rehabilitation at the University of Michigan Medical School. In 1992, she joined the faculty of Mount Holyoke College where she rose to the rank of full professor before retiring at the end of 2015.

Barry has published a blog in the magazine Psychology Today, entitled Eyes on the Brain, which explores the practical applications of the theory of neuroplasticity. She is married to former astronaut Daniel T. Barry.

== Stereo vision ==
=== Acquiring stereo vision ===
Barry had been affected by alternating esotropia since early age, and had undergone corrective operations to her eye muscles at two, three and seven years of age. At the age of forty, she became aware of difficulties in correctly perceiving objects at a distance, such as road signs and faces. The ophthalmologist whom she consulted told her that her eyesight of both eyes had only small flaws which were already corrected by her eyeglasses. Years later, after a colleague drew her attention to her tendency to disregard raised hands at the back of the large classroom, she consulted an optometrist who referred her to Ruggiero. With her, Barry embarked on vision therapy to stabilize her gaze. using the approach developed by Frederick W. Brock, including for example exercises to aim the two eyes at the same point in space using the Brock string.

She first saw 3D at the age of 48 sitting in the driving seat of her car after a session of vision therapy. In her own words she describes her experience as seeing the steering wheel "floating in front of the dashboard with this palpable volume of space between the steering wheel and the dashboard". It took her months to accept that she truly had stereo vision (stereopsis) "because of all of the scientific dogma that indicated that this was not possible". She contacted Oliver Sacks, with whom she had spoken of stereopsis at an earlier occasion. Together with ophthalmologist Bob Wasserman and vision physiologist Ralph Siegel, he came to visit her and Ruggiero in February 2005, and in 2006 he published an article on their story in The New Yorker.

=== Challenging earlier views ===
Barry had initially found it difficult to believe in her acquisition of stereo vision for the reason that the notion of critical period was firmly set since the groundbreaking work of Torsten Wiesel and David H. Hubel with deprivation experiments in which animals did not develop the neuronal basis for stereo vision if they were prevented from performing stereo fusion for a given time period after birth. Barry contacted Hubel, who had no difficulty in believing in her vision improvements and stated that their experiments in fact had not addressed the question whether the animals might have been able to recover stereo vision later.

Hubel explained to me that he had never attempted to correct the strabismus in animals in order to examine the effects of straightening the eyes on visual circuitry. It would have been difficult to realign the eyes surgically and even harder to train the animals with vision therapy. So, he couldn't be sure that the effects of strabismus on binocular circuitry were permanent. Yet to truly delineate a critical period, he and other scientists would have had to demonstrate that the effects of strabismus on cortical wiring cannot be reversed after a certain age. Indeed, Hubel had already stated these concerns in Brain and Visual Perception when he wrote, “A missing aspect of this work is knowledge of the time course of the strabismus animals, cats or monkeys, and in the monkeys the possibilities of recovery.”

— Susan R. Barry: Fixing my Gaze, 2009.

Hubel further suggested that newborns may be already equipped with binocular depth neurons.

In her book Fixing my Gaze, Barry points out that Wiesel and Hubel's results were mistakenly extrapolated, not by Wiesel and Hubel themselves, but by the majority of scientists and physicians, who mistakenly assumed that the critical period for developing amblyopia (a "lazy eye") also applied to the recovery from amblyopia. She concludes:

"So, today, older children and adults with amblyopia are told that nothing more can be done. What's more, development optometrists who disagree with this conclusion and successfully improve vision in older amblyopes may be labeled as sharks and charlatans."

== Other cases of acquired stereo vision ==
After the article on "Stereo Sue" was published, Barry found and took up contact with a number of people who shared with her their own stories of lacking and acquiring stereo vision. She reports on their experiences at regaining 3D vision in her book Fixing my Gaze.

Apart from the cases recounted by Barry, further cases have been pointed out recently in which a formerly stereoblind adult has acquired the ability for stereopsis.

This happened also to neuroscientist Bruce Bridgeman, professor of psychology and psychobiology at University of California Santa Cruz, who had grown up nearly stereoblind and acquired stereo vision spontaneously in 2012 at the age of 67, when watching the 3D movie Hugo with polarizing 3D glasses. The scene suddenly appeared to him in depth, and the ability to see the world in stereo stayed with him also after leaving the cinema.

== Works ==
- Fixing My Gaze: A Scientist's Journey into Seeing in Three Dimensions
- Coming to Our Senses: A Boy Who Learned to See, A Girl Who Learned to Hear, and How We All Discover the World
- Dear Oliver: An Unexpected Friendship with Oliver Sacks.

== Awards ==
The Princeton Review lists Barry among the 300 outstanding college teachers in the U.S., her paper on the work of Frederick W. Brock was selected as the best published paper in the Journal of Behavioral Optometry in 2011, and in 2013 she received the Meribeth E. Cameron Faculty Award for Scholarship.

== See also ==
- The Brain That Changes Itself
