= MKH =

MKH, MkH, Mkh, or mkh can refer to:

- MKH method, a method to improve binocular vision invented by German optician Hans-Joachim Haase
- Malakhera railway station, a train station in Malakhera, Rajasthan, India, by station code
- Mokhotlong Airport, an airport in Mokhotlong, Lesotho, by IATA code
- Mid-Cretaceous Hothouse, a geological era within the Cretaceous era
- Austroasiatic languages, a broad language family spoken in South, Southeast, and East Asia, by ISO 639 code
- Marcan Hypothesis, a variant of the Two-source hypothesis regarding the books of Matthew and Luke in the Bible
- Markhininite, a mineral; see List of mineral codes
