= Hans-Joachim Haase =

Hans-Joachim Haase (1915 – December 20, 2001) was a German clockmaker, optician and inventor, who became known for an apparatus for testing binocular vision and for the MKH method, an alternative method intended to improve binocular vision using corrective lenses. This method, which is controversial, has mainly found application in German-speaking countries.

== Life ==
Born the son of an optician, Haase underwent formal training to be a clockmaker and an optician, and became a Meister-optician in 1951.

From 1953 onwards he held a teaching position at the Staatliche Fachschule für Optik und Fototechnik (SFOF) in Berlin.

With an acute interest in binocular vision, Haase developed novel binocular vision testing methods based on the Turville infinity balance technique which had become known in Britain. He developed an apparatus for vision testing, which has since been built and sold by the Carl Zeiss company under the name Polatest.

== MKH method ==
Haase developed a method which is intended to improve binocular vision called the MKH method (short for: Mess- und Korrektionsmethodik nach H.-J. Haase), which has become known in German-speaking countries in particular.

The method consists in a measurement of an alleged angular misalignment (referred to as associated phoria or hidden strabismus, also called "Winkelfehlsichtigkeit" in German language) that is different from heterotropia or heterophoria, and involves the use of prisms for its correction. In the MKH method, this alleged misalignment is assessed by the Polatest apparatus and subsequently the patient is instructed to use prism glasses in daily life to correct for the alleged misalignment, with the prism glasses made according to the Polatest results. The MKH method claims to reduce eye strain-related symptoms. It has found some application in German-speaking countries and claims to achieve unimpaired binocular vision, however it has received little scientific recognition and is not accepted by mainstream medical practice, either internationally or in Germany. The method does not appear to show better results than conventional spectacle prescriptions, and the practice of MKH has been criticized as contravening the rule to first do no harm. The German association of ophthalmologists (Berufsverband der Augenärzte Deutschlands (BVA)) issued a statement warning that the use of the MKH method could in fact lead to use of prisms of increasing strength, ultimately requiring the patient to undergo strabismus surgery that would have otherwise been unnecessary.

The vision therapy approach that is widespread in the U.S. and which has led to recover stereopsis in a number of persons, most notably Susan R. Barry, is diametrically opposed to the use of prisms in the manner that is advocated in the MKH method. In particular, Frederick W. Brock spoke against the use of an amblyoscope during training, because in his view the patient needed to take the correct binocular posture (aiming the two eyes such that they simultaneously look at the same target in space) when fusing, otherwise the training would not be likely to succeed.

In any case, tentative studies have been undertaken whether some synergy can be found between the U.S. approach to vision therapy and the German approach of MKH.

== Awards ==
Haase received the following awards:

- Deutscher Preis für Optometrie (DGO)
- Simon-Plössl-Medal (Austria)
- Honorary award in gold of the Zentralverband der Augenoptiker

The International Association for Binocular Vision (Internationale Vereinigung für Binokulares Sehen, IVBS) was created to further advance his MKH method. The association created a prize in his name that can be awarded since 2003.

== Publications ==
- Haase, Hans-Joachim (1995) [1980]. Zur Fixationsdisparation (in German) (2 (expanded reprint of article series 1980-1984) ed.). Heidelberg, Germany: Verlag Optische Fachveröffentlichung GmbH. ISBN 978-3-922269-17-5.
- Haase, Hans-Joachim (1980). Binokulare Korrektion - Methodik und Theorie (in German) (Compilation of publications from 1957–1978 ed.). Düsseldorf: Verlag Willy Schrickel. ISBN 978-3-921405-10-9.
- Haase, Hans-Joachim (1999). Winkelfehlsichtigkeiten mit Fixationsdisparation - Erörterungen zur Theorie der Fixationsdisparation und zur Funktionsweise der notwendigen Teste für die Ermittlung binokularer Vollkorrektionen. Pforzheim: Bode. ISBN 978-3-9800378-7-7.
