= A. M. Skeffington =

American optometrist (1890-1976)

Arthur Marten Skeffington (1890 – 1976) was an American optometrist known to some as "the father of behavioral optometry". Skeffington has been credited with co-founding the Optometric Extension Program with E.B. Alexander in 1928. In the mid-1950s, Skeffington first diagrammed his "four circles" model of describing visual processing.

== Honors ==
The College of Optometrists in Vision Development (COVD) annually awards the Skeffington Award in his honor to an individual who has made outstanding contributions to optometric literature in the areas of vision therapy and vision development.

Furthermore, there is an annual Kraskin Invitational Skeffington Symposium on Vision.
