= Cheiroscope =

Optical device

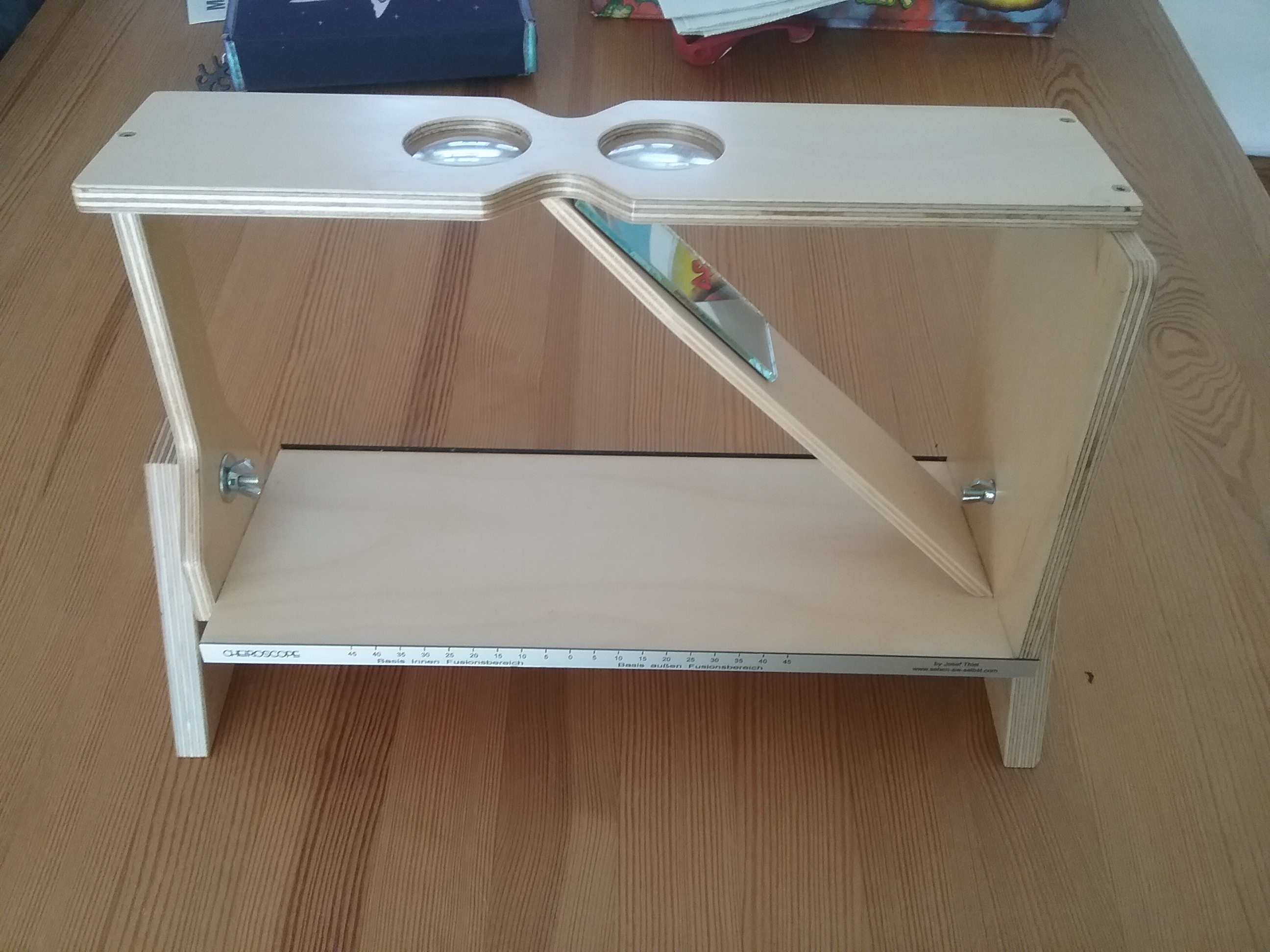
A wooden cheiroscope

A cheiroscope (also: chiroscope) is an optical device consisting of a viewing instrument equipped with a drawing pad, with the viewing instrument set up as a haploscope that blends a left and/or right image into view over the drawing.

The cheiroscope was presented in an article published in 1929. The author E. E. Maddox writes that compared to the earlier amblyoscope,

"[t]he cheiroscope approaches the problem from a different and complementary angle, on the simple principle of pressing the hand into service to educate the eye."

A cheiroscope can be operated in different manners. For example, using a cheiroscope, a line image can be presented to one eye and the image of a blank sheet to the other eye, and the subject is intended to make a drawing that reproduces the line image.

The cheiroscope is used for diagnostic purposes to test binocular vision, to assess certain conditions of strabism in particular related to binocular stability and alignment, cyclotropia, and the presence and extent of suppression. It can also be used in vision therapy to train amblyopic subjects in desuppression and eye–hand coordination.

A stereoscope can be modified to function as a cheiroscope.

== See also ==
- Diplopia
- Amblyopia
- Orthoptist
