= College of Optometrists in Vision Development =

The College of Optometrists in Vision Development (COVD) consists of optometrists, vision therapists, and other vision specialists.

Optometry & Vision Development is an official COVD peer reviewed publication. It is published four times a year and is an open access international journal that is available both online and in hard copy.

== See also ==
- American Academy of Optometry
- Optometric Extension Program
