= Survivor: Panama =

- Season 12
- Region 1 DVD cover
- Presented by: Jeff Probst
- No. of days: 39
- No. of castaways: 16
- Winner: Aras Baskauskas
- Runner-up: Danielle DiLorenzo
- Location: Pearl Islands, Panama
- No. of episodes: 16

Release
- Original network: CBS
- Original release: February 2 – May 14, 2006

Additional information
- Filming dates: October 31 – December 8, 2005

Season chronology
- ← Previous; Guatemala — The Maya Empire Next → Cook Islands

Survivor: Panama — Exile Island (commonly referred to as Survivor: Exile Island and/or Survivor: Panama) is the twelfth season of the American CBS competitive reality television series Survivor. The season was filmed in the Pearl Islands, off the coast of Panama from October 31, 2005, through December 8, 2005, and premiered on February 2, 2006. Hosted by Jeff Probst, it consisted of the usual 39 days of gameplay with 16 competitors and was the first season with 16 competitors since Survivor: Pearl Islands five seasons prior.

Aras Baskauskas was named the Sole Survivor over Danielle DiLorenzo in a 5–2 vote.

== Format ==
Survivor is a reality television show created by Mark Burnett and Charlie Parsons and based on the Swedish show Expedition Robinson. The series follows a number of participants who are isolated in a remote location, where they must provide food, fire, and shelter for themselves. Every three days, one participant is removed from the series by majority vote, with challenges being held to give a reward (ranging from living and food-related prizes to a car) and immunity from being voted off the show. The last remaining player is awarded a prize of $1,000,000.

== Contestants ==
The 16 players were initially split into four tribes by sex and age: young men (Viveros), older men (La Mina), young women (Bayoneta), and older women (Casaya). These four tribes were named after four islands located in the Pearl Islands. Shortly after the first Tribal Council, the Viveros and Bayoneta tribes were dissolved and a "schoolyard pick" formed two new integrated tribes using the Casaya and La Mina tribe names and camps. When there were ten contestants left, they merged into one tribe named Gitanos, the Spanish word for "gypsy." Coincidentally, a member from each of the original four tribes was represented in the final four.

Notable contestants from this season include former NASA astronaut Dan Barry and former Miss Texas Teen USA Misty Giles. Tina Scheer was originally slated for the previous season Survivor: Guatemala, but she backed out due to her son's death prior to that season.

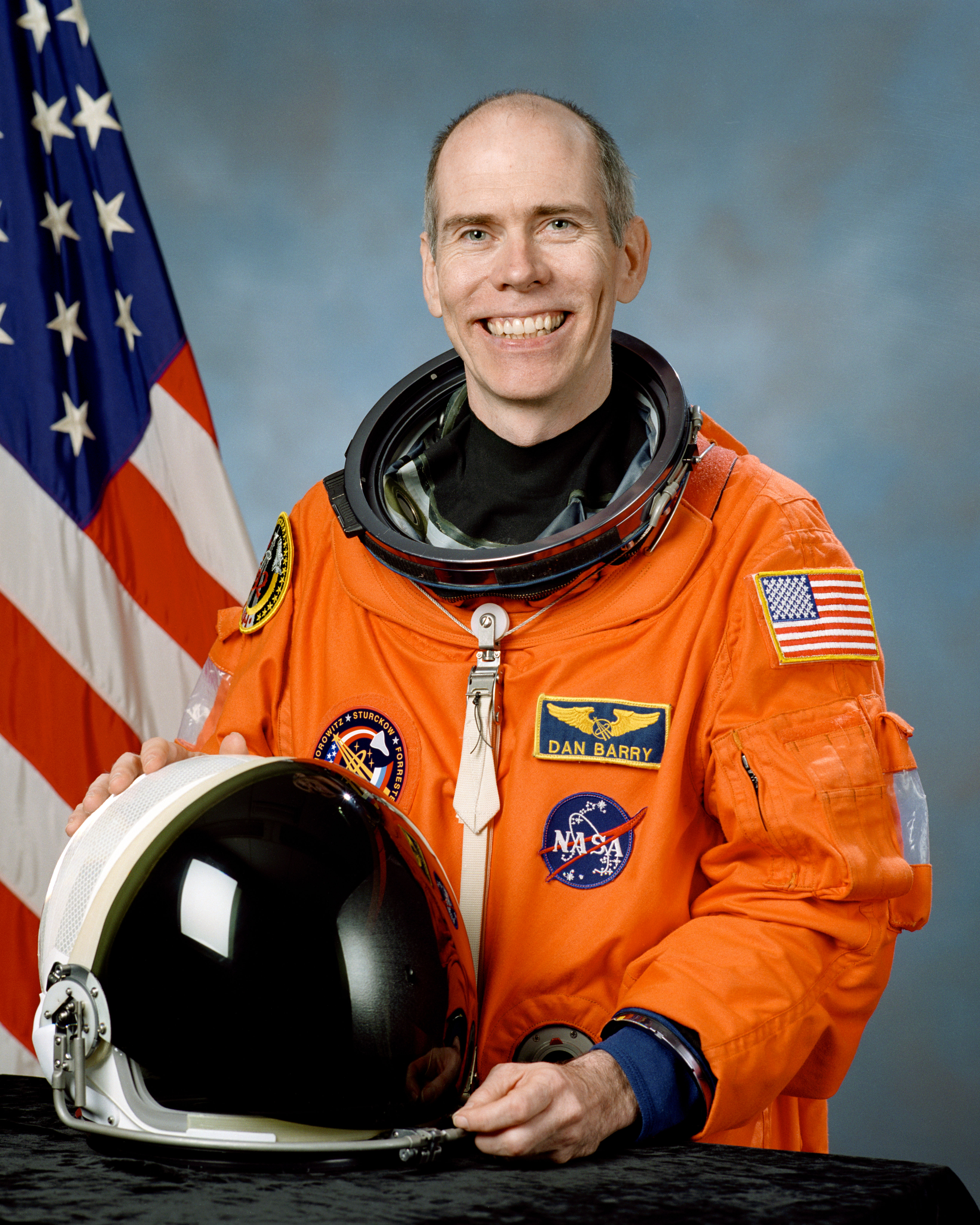
Dan Barry

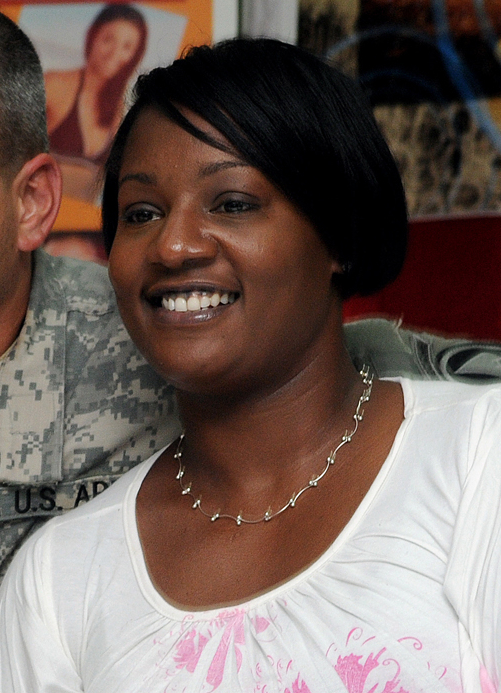
Cirie Fields

List of Survivor: Panama – Exile Island contestants
Contestant	Age	From	Tribe			Finish	
Contestant	Age	From	Original	Switched	Merged	Placement	Day
Tina Scheer	44	Hayward, Wisconsin	Casaya			1st voted out	Day 3
Melinda Hyder	32	Sevierville, Tennessee	Casaya	Casaya		2nd voted out	Day 6
Misty Giles	24	Dallas, Texas	Bayoneta	La Mina		3rd voted out	Day 8
Ruth Marie Milliman	48	Greenville, South Carolina	Casaya	La Mina		4th voted out	Day 11
Bobby Mason	32	Los Angeles, California	Viveros	Casaya		5th voted out	Day 14
Dan Barry	51	South Hadley, Massachusetts	La Mina	La Mina		6th voted out	Day 15
Nick Stanbury	25	Tempe, Arizona	Viveros	La Mina	Gitanos	7th voted out	Day 18
Austin Carty	24	High Point, North Carolina	Viveros	La Mina	Gitanos	8th voted out 1st jury member	Day 21
Sally Schumann	27	Chicago, Illinois	Bayoneta	La Mina	Gitanos	9th voted out 2nd jury member	Day 24
Bruce Kanegai	57	Simi Valley, California	La Mina	Casaya	Gitanos	Medically evacuated 3rd jury member	Day 25
Courtney Marit	31	Los Angeles, California	Bayoneta	Casaya	Gitanos	10th voted out 4th jury member	Day 30
Shane Powers	35	Los Angeles, California	La Mina	Casaya	Gitanos	11th voted out 5th jury member	Day 33
Cirie Fields	35	Walterboro, South Carolina	Casaya	Casaya	Gitanos	Eliminated; 6th jury member	Day 36
Terry Deitz	46	Simsbury, Connecticut	La Mina	La Mina	Gitanos	12th voted out 7th jury member	Day 38
Danielle DiLorenzo	24	Pompano Beach, Florida	Bayoneta	Casaya	Gitanos	Runner-up	Day 39
Aras Baskauskas	24	Santa Monica, California	Viveros	Casaya	Gitanos	Sole Survivor	Day 39

=== Future appearances ===
Cirie Fields was selected from this season to compete in Survivor: Micronesia. She competed again in Survivor: Heroes vs. Villains as part of the Heroes tribe, and would return for a fourth time on Survivor: Game Changers. Fields represented USA on Australian Survivor: Australia V The World in 2025. Fields also competed on Survivor 50: In the Hands of the Fans.

Danielle DiLorenzo also competed on Heroes vs. Villains as part of the Villains tribe. Aras Baskauskas returned for Survivor: Blood vs. Water, alongside his brother, Vytas. Terry Deitz and Shane Powers were included on the public poll to choose the cast of Survivor: Cambodia; Deitz was chosen to compete.

Outside of Survivor, Dan Barry competed on the seventh season of BattleBots in 2016. Fields competed in the USA Network reality competition series Snake in the Grass. Fields also competed on the first season of the Peacock reality TV series The Traitors and Big Brother 25 in 2023.

== Season summary ==
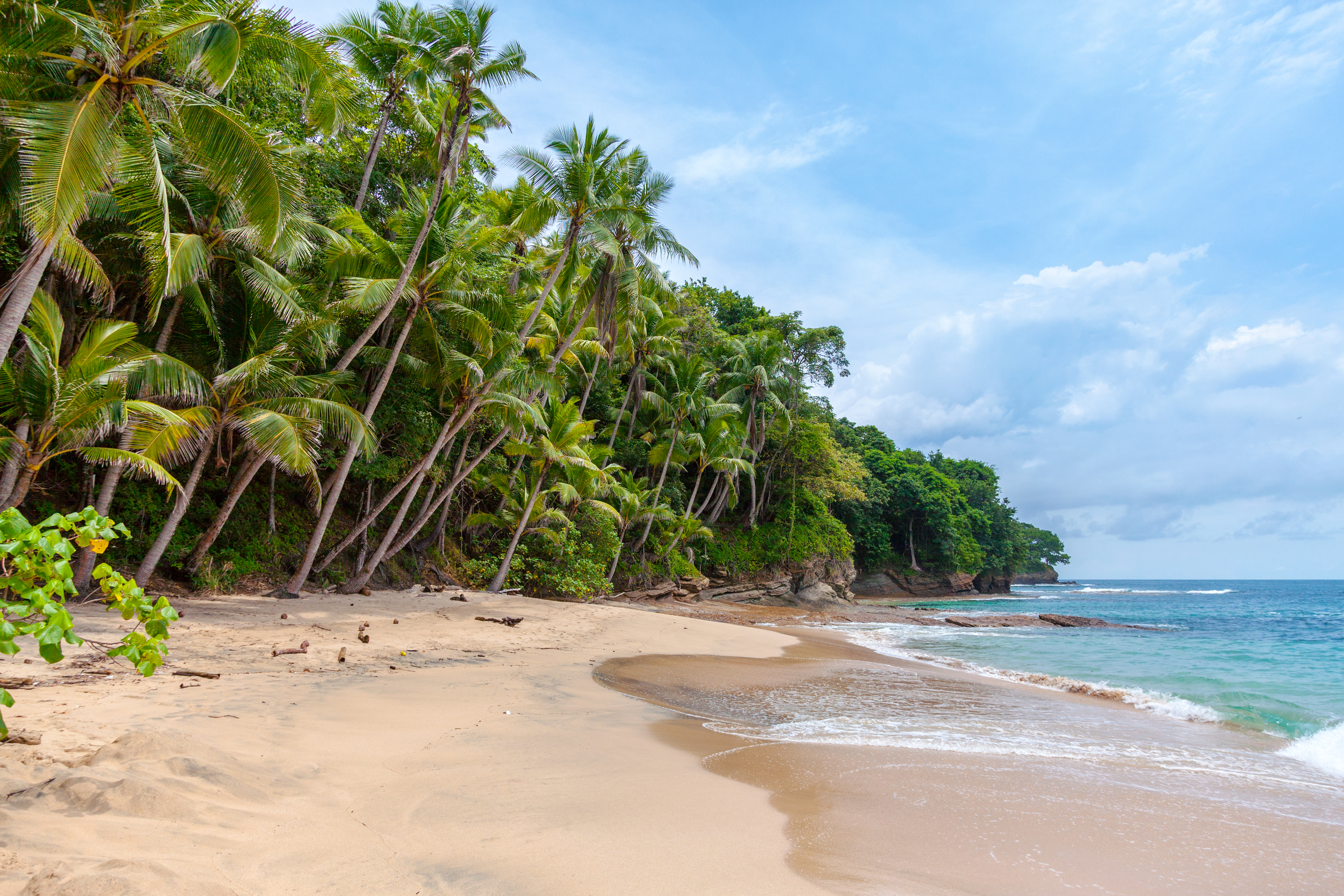
The season was filmed in the Pearl Islands in Panama.

The game began with the 16 competitors split into four tribes by both relative age and gender. They were introduced to the concept of "Exile Island" with the promise of a hidden immunity idol located somewhere on it, while one person from the losing tribe at challenges would be sent to the island and given clues to look for it. After the first four days, the four tribes were merged by schoolyard pick with mixed genders into two tribes, Casaya and La Mina. On Casaya, a majority alliance consisting of Aras, Shane, Courtney, and Danielle was formed. Cirie was later integrated into the group thanks to her strong social bonds, particularly with Aras and Danielle. On La Mina, Terry was viewed as the tribe leader. Casaya generally proved the stronger tribe, and opted to send Terry from La Mina over to Exile Island multiple times, which gave him the opportunity to discover the hidden immunity idol.

Going into the merge, Casaya was up 6 members to 4. While Terry won several individual immunities, he did not use it or the hidden immunity idol to save his former La Mina tribe members, leaving him as the sole remaining La Mina member and a perceived immunity challenge threat by the former Casaya tribe. Bruce was evacuated due a medical emergency, leaving six players at the game. At this juncture, Cirie, who saw both Terry and Shane looking separately to take Courtney, a weaker player, into the final Tribal Council as an assurance to win the jury's favor, convinced Aras and Danielle to blindside the other three, and succeeded in achieving Courtney's elimination, followed by Shane's. At the final four vote, Aras won immunity and Terry possessed the hidden immunity idol. The vote came down a fire-making tiebreaker between Cirie and Danielle; Danielle ultimately prevailed. Danielle won the final immunity challenge and opted to take Aras to the final Tribal Council, eliminating Terry. The final jury saw both Aras and Danielle as capable players but ultimately voted Aras as the Sole Survivor, five votes to two.

Challenge winners and eliminations by episode
Episode			Challenge winner(s)		Exile Island	Eliminated	
No.	Title	Original air date	Reward	Immunity	Exile Island	Tribe	Player
1	"The First Exile"	February 2, 2006	Terry (La Mina) (Note: This player won the hero challenge, earning reward for their entire tribe.)	Bayoneta	Misty (Bayoneta)	Casaya	Tina
1	"The First Exile"	February 2, 2006	Austin (Viveros)	La Mina	Misty (Bayoneta)	Casaya	Tina
1	"The First Exile"	February 2, 2006	Ruth Marie (Casaya)	Viveros	Misty (Bayoneta)	Casaya	Tina
2	"Breakdown"	February 9, 2006	La Mina	La Mina	Bruce (Note: Bruce was sent to Exile Island after not being chosen in the tribe switch. He joined the tribe that lost the subsequent immunity challenge: Casaya.)	Casaya	Melinda
3	"Crazy Fights, Snake Dinners"	February 16, 2006	La Mina	Casaya	Bruce (Casaya)	La Mina	Misty
4	"Starvation and Lunacy"	February 23, 2006	Casaya	Casaya	Terry (La Mina)	La Mina	Ruth Marie
5	"For Cod's Sake"	March 2, 2006	Casaya	La Mina	Terry (La Mina)	Casaya	Bobby
6	"Salvation and Desertion"	March 9, 2006	Casaya		Sally (La Mina)	La Mina	Dan
7	"A Closer Look"	March 15, 2006	Recap Episode				
8	"An Emerging Plan"	March 30, 2006	None (Note: There was no reward challenge or exile due to the merge.)	Terry	None	Gitanos	Nick
9	"The Power of the Idol"	April 6, 2006	Aras, Bruce, Sally	Terry	Austin	Gitanos	Austin
9	"The Power of the Idol"	April 6, 2006	Aras, Bruce, Sally	Terry	Danielle	Gitanos	Austin
10	"Fight for Your Life or Eat"	April 13, 2006	Bruce, Courtney, Sally, Terry	Terry	Aras	Gitanos	Sally
11	"Medical Emergency"	April 20, 2006	Cirie [Aras, Danielle]	None (Note: Due to Bruce being medically evacuated from the game, there was no Immunity Challenge or Tribal Council.)	Terry	Gitanos	Bruce
12	"Perilous Scramble"	April 27, 2006	Courtney, Danielle, Terry (Note: In addition to the team reward, Terry won a car for winning the second part of the challenge.)	Terry	Aras	Gitanos	Courtney
13	"Bamboozled"	May 4, 2006	Terry [Shane] (Note: For the loved ones visit, Terry had to assign how much time with their loved one everyone got. Terry brought Shane and their loved ones (Terry's wife and Shane's son) to his overnight reward. Terry gave Cirie the chance to spend the night with her husband at camp, Aras a hug from his mother, and exiled Danielle, who could only share a few words with her mother.)	Terry	Danielle	Gitanos	Shane
14	"Call the Whambulence!"	May 11, 2006	Aras [Cirie]	Aras	Danielle	Gitanos	Tiebreaker challenge continued on the following episode (Note: Cirie and Danielle were tied at Tribal Council, but before the tie-breaker challenge was shown, the episode ended. At the start of the next episode, the fire-making tie-breaker was aired.)
14	"Call the Whambulence!"	May 11, 2006	Aras [Cirie]	Aras	Terry	Gitanos	Tiebreaker challenge continued on the following episode
15	"The Final Showdown"	May 14, 2006	Conclusion of previous Tribal Council			Gitanos	Cirie
15	"The Final Showdown"	May 14, 2006	Terry	Danielle	None	Gitanos	Terry
16	"Reunion"	May 14, 2006					

In the case of multiple tribes or castaways who win reward or immunity, they are listed in order of finish, or alphabetically where it was a team effort; where one castaway won and invited others, the invitees are in brackets.

== Episodes ==
No. overall	No. in season	Title	Original release date	U.S. viewers (millions)	Rating/share (18–49)
168	1	"The First Exile"	February 2, 2006	19.20	7.0/18
All 16 castaways arrived on what was later revealed as Exile Island for the start of the game. They were divided into four tribes based on their age and gender. Jeff explained the mechanics of Exile Island to the castaways and announced that they'll compete in their first reward challenge.: Reward Challenge: Each of the four tribes will produce one representative, who has to run across Exile Island to find a pile of skulls. The representative must smash the skull that contains a tightly bound ball of fabric. Inside the fabric was either an amulet or a stone. If they found an amulet, the representative must run back to their tribemates. If they find a stone, they must go back and select another skull and repeat the process until the amulet is found. First three tribes to finish win flint to make fire.; With Viveros, Casaya and La Mina victorious, the losing tribe, Bayoneta, had to pick one of their own to stay on Exile, who would return in time for the next immunity challenge. Through Rock, Paper, Scissors, it was decided among the younger women that Misty would remain. After all the other castaways left Exile Island, Jeff gave Misty the first clue to the Hidden Immunity Idol. The older tribes fared well, with Tina's leadership at Casaya helping everyone get chores done and La Mina successfully building a bonfire, however the younger tribes were less productive. Misty spent her time looking for the idol at Exile Island with the clue given, but failed to locate it.: Immunity challenge: Beginning on platforms in the ocean, the tribes must race over a wall, dive into the ocean and swim to their tribe raft. The last person over the wall dives down to unclip a rope underwater, releasing the raft. The tribe then paddles the raft towards shore. Once the tribe latches their raft to the hitching post on shore, they race to solve a brainteaser puzzle, which releases a giant ring. The tribe has the option to dig down several feet and search to uncover an answer key to solve the brainteaser. Once the ring is released, the tribe attaches it to a rope that they use to throw at a grappling hook to unfurl their tribe flag. The first three tribes to raise their flags win Immunity.; At the first immunity challenge, Misty returned from Exile Island and pretended she found the immunity idol hidden there, although it was not necessary when Bayoneta finished first. The male tribes La Mina and Viveros finished second and third, and Casaya headed to Tribal Council. Back at Casaya, Tina was mourning the loss of her son, who died a few months before filming, but later caught a sizable fish while Ruth Marie and Melinda were debating whether to vote out Cirie for being a weak link or Tina for being a social recluse. At Tribal Council, Tina accused her tribemates about their work ethic, creating animosity between her and the rest of tribe. In the end, Ruth Marie and Melinda sided with Cirie as Tina was voted out 3–1.
169	2	"Breakdown"	February 9, 2006	18.75	6.6/17
Following a terrible storm, the tribes gathered for a Reward Challenge and were shocked to learn they would be rearranged. Bayoneta and Viveros were disbanded, with all remaining contestants spread across the new Casaya and La Mina tribes of seven people each through a schoolyard pick, with Danielle and Terry as captains. The new La Mina tribe consisted of Austin, Dan, Misty, Nick, Ruth Marie, Sally, and Terry. The new Casaya tribe consisted of Aras, Bobby, Cirie, Courtney, Danielle, Melinda, and Shane. With Bruce left over as a result of the odd number of castaways, he was granted immunity and sent to Exile Island for three days until tribal council and would join the tribe that lost the next immunity challenge.: Reward challenge: The two new tribes must race through an obstacle course, collecting six wooden snakes along the way. The tribes will collect two snakes at each of three stations. Each tribe must delegate one player to carry all six snakes throughout the entire course. The first tribe to cross the finish line with all their snakes wins a fishing spear, bait and a raft.; The new La Mina Tribe won the reward challenge.: Immunity challenge: The tribes must transport a giant zombie head from the ocean to the beach. Each tribe has a boat anchored to the ocean floor with a large wooden box. In addition, each boat has six holes filled with rubber plugs. Five tribe members have to pull out the plugs and begin bailing water out of the boat while the other two tribe members jump into the water and start moving the boat by pulling the anchor towards shore. Once the boat is clipped onto the hitching post, it's a race up the beach to put the anchor on the finish mat. The first tribe to put the zombie head on the zombie body wins Immunity.; Despite quickly losing their newly acquired spear in deep water, La Mina won the immunity challenge as well. Before Tribal Council, Shane considered quitting because of nicotine withdrawal but his newly formed alliance of Aras, Courtney, and Danielle convinced him to get over it. At Tribal Council, Bruce arrived to witness Tribal Council before joining the tribe after one of them was vote out. The five new Casaya members ganged up on the only "Older Women" members Cirie and Melinda, with Melinda voted out in a 5–2 vote. After Melinda's departure, Bruce joined Casaya.
170	3	"Crazy Fights, Snake Dinners"	February 16, 2006	16.98	6.3/16
At Casaya, Bruce used spare T-shirts to develop a water filtration system, meaning his tribe did not need to boil the brackish water before drinking it. It proved popular with some, but Courtney met it with skepticism.: Reward Challenge: Using a giant slingshot, three tribe members will be the launchers, while the other four will stand on a balance beam over the water. One tribe member will launch a ball to the other four, who must catch it before it hits the water. The first tribe to catch five balls wins a kerosene lantern, water canisters, blankets, pillows, rope and a tarp.; La Mina won camping essentials and the right to choose which member of Casaya would be exiled at the Reward Challenge. They chose Bruce, believing that his absence would most demoralize the tribe. Shane's mood swings continued and created friction among his alliance.: Immunity challenge: Each team will compete in varying match-ups, racing head-to-head to five circles in the sand. Buried within each circle is a bag. The tribes must dig and find the bag, and then get back to the finish mat. To score, there must be at least one hand on the bag while any part of the body touches the finish mat. First tribe to score three wins immunity.; Casaya won their first immunity challenge, and back at La Mina, Dan and Terry recruited Nick and Austin to target Misty due to her poor performance in the immunity challenge combined with possibly having the hidden immunity idol. Her bluff about obtaining the hidden immunity idol proved false as she was blindsided 5–2.
171	4	"Starvation and Lunacy"	February 23, 2006	14.85	5.5/14
Reward Challenge: Each tribe gets six floating puzzle pieces. One tribe member at a time will swim out, dive down, unclip a puzzle piece, and bring it back to the puzzle frame. Once the piece is placed in the puzzle frame, the next person can go out. When all six of the puzzle pieces have been collected, the tribe may start assembling the puzzle by matching corresponding symbols on each side of every piece. First tribe to get it together correctly win rolls of toilet paper, bath essentials and a fully functional outhouse.; Before the Reward Challenge, Bruce, Aras and Shane returned from foraging for food to find the rest of their tribe had let the fire go out. After a lesson about responsibility around the campsite, they pulled together and won the Reward Challenge for bathroom and supplies, and chose to exile Terry, because they believed him to be his tribe’s leader. Bobby created some friction with his teammates by disagreeing with how the reward should be used. La Mina tried to organize their camp, but were lost without Terry. At Exile Island, Terry discovered the mysterious hidden immunity idol (a makeshift shrunken head concealed inside a bottle), which he kept as a secret from his teammates after his return.: Immunity challenge: One person is seated in a chair attached to a pulley, while another person is situated directly above them in a crow's nest, where an empty water drum hangs. The other four remaining tribe members are together in pairs, which will race across a balance beam carrying buckets. Once they reach the water, they must dip their bucket in, get water, race back and empty the water into a larger pail. The person in the crow's nest will pull that pail up and empty the water into the drum. As the drum takes on water, it will lower, but the person in the chair will rise until they're high enough to pull a pin releasing their tribe's flag. First tribe to release their flag wins Immunity.; Dan pulled in Ruth Marie as a fifth person in his alliance, but after losing another immunity challenge, Sally convinced the La Mina men that she was a more valuable player. In the end, strength outweighed loyalty as Ruth Marie was voted out 4–2.
172	5	"For Cod's Sake"	March 2, 2006	16.08	5.5/14
Bruce's "Zen Garden" caused friction in Casaya and Aras felt he should instead have been helping with the daily camp chores.: Reward Challenge: Each tribe will designate a retriever to transport rice, beans and fish from a boat to the shore. The retriever must race out, retrieve one item and bring it back to shore, then toss the item to their tribemates, who will be lined up. The item will be tossed from one person to the next until it reaches the last person, who will toss it into the appropriate bin. Once the item is in the bin, the retriever must go out and get another item. The first two items will be a bag of rice and a bag of beans. Thereafter, the items will be fish. Once a fish gets to the end of the line, the last person must chop off its head and the tail before throwing the body into the bin. The first tribe to eight wins a sack of rice, beans and three large fish; the losing tribe was given a choice between a sack of beans or a sack of rice.; Incorporating the reward into the challenge, the winning tribe would receive all the items that were used in the challenge: fish, rice, spices, and wine. The losing tribe will not go back to camp empty-handed, for they were to choose either a sack of rice or a sack of beans. La Mina lost again and Casaya chose Terry to go to Exile Island for the second time in a row. As Casaya returned to camp, they found out that their shelter was ruined due to the storm that happened during the challenge. Since the storm also extinguished their fire and they were unable to create another one on account of everything being wet, they merely enjoyed what they had and ate the fish raw. Meanwhile, as La Mina ate the beans that they chose from the Reward Challenge, Austin and Nick faced the gastrointestinal consequences. The next morning at Casaya, Danielle and Courtney learned Bruce and Bobby spent the night sleeping in their outhouse, drinking all the wine they had won, which caused friction and a heated argument between Bobby and Courtney.: Immunity challenge Each tribe must send three members to paddle out to collect skulls from four coffins sitting on the ocean floor. Each time a coffin is found, someone must dive under water, open the coffin and find a skull puzzle piece. They'll then untie the puzzle piece and bring it back to the boat. Once all four skull puzzle pieces have been collected, they will return them to shore. The two remaining tribe members use those four puzzle pieces to build a skull pyramid. The first tribe to build their skull pyramid and place their gold skull on top wins Immunity.; At the immunity challenge, La Mina constructed the skull pyramid faster than Casaya, finally breaking their losing streak and winning Immunity. After the immunity challenge, Shane told Bobby that Bruce was the next to go, as his tribe feared he would flip over to La Mina's alliance come time of the merge. He assured Bobby he wasn't to go by swearing on his son's name; however, Cirie, Courtney and Danielle overpowered Shane and told him they felt Bruce was more trustworthy and less problematic. At tribal council, Shane voted for Aras as a "throwaway vote" as not to choose either side, and the women of Casaya led an erratic 3–2–1–1 vote, resulting in Bobby's elimination.
173	6	"Salvation and Desertion"	March 9, 2006	15.33	5.4/14
At La Mina's camp, while Austin and the other men searched for edible creatures in the water, Dan spoke to Nick about his space flights at NASA. At Casaya, the women complained to Shane about how disrespectful he was.: Reward/immunity challenge: The tribes must each choose three members to race one at a time out into a field to untie, lower, unhook and retrieve four puzzle pieces. Once all four pieces have been collected, the two remaining tribe members will use those pieces to solve a spinning puzzle. The first tribe to solve it correctly will win Immunity and a feast in a Panamanian village and immunity.; In a combined reward and immunity challenge, Casaya, despite falling back early, won a barbecue and a trip to a local village, as well as the right to exile someone from La Mina. Because the losing tribe would be attending Tribal Council, Sally, the only woman left in La Mina was exiled and was granted Immunity and unable to vote. Despite being alone, she enjoyed the knowledge that her banishment would break up the men's alliance. Meanwhile, Casaya enjoyed their reward. They rode a boat to a village and gave some toys to children. Shane saw someone smoking and talked about giving up all his clothes just to smoke a cigarette. He ended up smoking after a long abstinence. Later the tribe enjoyed barbecue, played soccer, and partied. At Tribal Council, the four men discussed how tight their alliance was, and the possibility of a two vs. two tie vote. In the end, Terry sided with the younger men and Dan was voted off 3–1.
174	7	"A Closer Look"	March 15, 2006	12.68	4.4/
A recap of the first 15 days including previously un-aired bonus footage.
175	8	"An Emerging Plan"	March 30, 2006	16.25	5.8/17
La Mina received treemail that they are to go to Casaya for the merge. As the tribe approached Casaya's camp, Shane pulled his tribe together in an agreement to vote out the other Tribe in the next four Tribal Councils and the Casaya members, who were eating, ate as much rice as they could to avoid sharing with La Mina, then greeted them with open arms. While building a larger shelter, Nick accidentally chipped Bruce's tooth with a machete, but Bruce was fine. Meanwhile, Terry tried to convince Shane and Cirie to flip, claiming he could guarantee them two more weeks in the game, but no one would budge.: Immunity challenge: Each tribe member will have to hang upside down with arms and legs wrapped around a pole. They must hang there for as long as they can. Whoever falls off of the pole will be eliminated. The last castaway hanging wins Immunity.; At the immunity challenge, the survivors hung on a pole with their hands and feet only. Cirie lasted only 3 minutes and after a point all the Casaya members voluntarily jumped off, leaving Terry, Austin and Nick to fight for immunity. Austin asked Terry to throw the challenge and let him give immunity, as he was convinced he was going home, but Terry wouldn't budge, despite having the hidden immunity idol. Austin fell off, then Nick did after 45 minutes, giving Terry his first victory. Before Tribal Council, Bruce drew the name "Gitanos" for their new tribe name, meaning "Gypsies" in Spanish. Later that night, Nick, considered the second strongest member after Terry, was voted out along former tribal lines, 6–4.
176	9	"The Power of the Idol"	April 6, 2006	16.36	5.6/17
With Nick voted out, the former La Mina tribe attempted to flip some of the Casaya tribe members.: Reward challenge: The Gitanos tribe will be divided into three teams of three. Each team will have one boat and 100 coconuts. They must race to put the coconuts into the boats of the other two teams. The more coconuts in the boat, the slower it will be. Once the teams have exhausted their coconut supplies, they'll paddle out in their boats to retrieve a tribe flag and fishing net, return to shore and use the fishing net to carry all the coconuts from their boat back up the beach and into the bin. The first tribe to get all the coconuts in their bin and on their finish mat with their tribe flag wins a reward of breakfast in bed.; At the reward challenge, the castaways were split into three teams, and Bruce, Aras, and Sally ended up victorious thanks to Aras’s plan to ally with another team. Austin and Danielle were exiled together, while the winners enjoyed a big breakfast in a rain-soaked bed.: Immunity challenge: The Survivors will race through a series of obstacles in four stages. In the first stage, all nine Survivors must race to dig through the sand and pull themselves under a wooden fence. The first six to finish move on to the second round, in which they must complete a brainteaser with four written clues to guide them. After completing the brainteaser, they climb up a sand hill, through a maze and over a second sand hill. The first three to finish this phase will move on to phase three, which requires them to navigate across a rope bridge using two wooden planks. Once they've reached the end of the bridge, they must jump off the platform into the water and climb up a steep sand bank. The first to the top of the sand bank move on to the final round: a race through a series of vertical and horizontal tunnels and towers until the first person finishes, winning Immunity.; At the immunity challenge, the castaways competed in an obstacle course, with a few contestants getting eliminated in each round. Terry ended up victorious with his second individual immunity win in a row, narrowly beating Sally. Back at camp, the former La Mina tribe tried to convince Bruce and Danielle, viewed as the two outcasts of their alliance, to switch to the La Mina alliance. Terry offered Danielle the immunity idol in exchange for her switch. At Tribal Council, Danielle and Bruce still showed loyalty to Casaya, and, with a 6–3 vote, voted off former La Mina's strongest non-immune member, Austin.
177	10	"Fight for Your Life or Eat"	April 13, 2006	15.07	5.2/17
After another La Mina's departure, Sally and Terry were at their most desperate to keep themselves in the game.: Reward challenge: After watching a preview of their videos from home, the tribe will be divided into two teams. One person will lie face down on a cradle suspended in the air by bungee cords. Attached to that cradle are three ropes. The teammates will pull those ropes to maneuver the person on the cradle as they grab fifteen flags and place them in order into their appropriate slots. The first team to get all fifteen flags in order wins the full length version of their videos from home, plus peanut butter and jelly sandwiches and a glass of milk.; At the reward challenge, the team of Bruce, Courtney, Sally, and Terry won a videos from home, peanut butter & jelly sandwiches, and ice-cold milk. They chose Aras to be sent to Exile Island. Back at the camp, a paranoid Shane told registered nurse Cirie that he was "having problems" with his testicles (and stripped naked in the process, save his shirt). When the winning team got back, they brought some of their reward with them.: Immunity challenge: Each Survivor is asked to grab a nut and a shell and put them in opposite hands. For the challenge, each person will swim out to a long plank with seven symbols on it resting on the ocean floor. They will have to memorize the symbols in order and race back to the beach, where they will try to replicate those symbols, in order, on their answer board. The first person to solve the puzzle correctly wins Immunity. With participation in this challenge being optional, if someone chooses not to participate, they will instead be able to enjoy cheeseburgers, french fries, and soft drinks. They can only eat for as long as the challenge goes or until the food runs out.; At the immunity challenge, the players had to decide between a feast of cheeseburgers, fries, and soft drinks or the immunity challenge. Bruce, Cirie, Courtney, Danielle, and Shane decided to feast, whereas Aras, Sally, and Terry chose to participate. Terry narrowly defeated Aras, with Sally placing third. When the Survivors got back to camp, Sally and Terry continued their efforts to break the Casaya alliance. Despite their efforts, the Casaya alliance held strong, and Sally was voted out 6–2.
178	11	"Medical Emergency"	April 20, 2006	16.26	5.5/18
Terry seemed to become more bitter about his continued status outside of the alliance.: Reward challenge: Each of the castaways will fill out a questionnaire in private, then the results will be tallied and the challenge will begin. The questions will be posed to the group. At this time, they will guess whose name came up most often. Each time someone gets a correct answer, they'll get to chop one of three ropes assigned to each tribe member. After three chops, the rope will release a torch that will in turn send their voodoo dolls up in flames. The winner would receive a visit to a spa.; In a reward challenge where the contestants voted about their fellow contestants, Courtney was shocked to learn she was considered the most unpopular of the tribe. By correctly guessing what the majority of the tribe had chosen for their answers, Cirie won the challenge and sent Terry to Exile Island, taking Aras and Danielle to share her reward. Cirie then worried about what effect her decisions might have with the other players. Back at the camp, Courtney was bitter because of some of the opinions expressed in the challenge and Shane was upset because he hadn't been chosen by Cirie for the reward. Shane attempted to ally himself with Courtney, but to no avail. Bruce, who had been sick for several days, was in increasing pain. He claimed to have not gone to the toilet since the Panamanian village reward. Finally, he couldn't take it any longer and asked for medical assistance. The medical team arrived and took him out of the game. Later that day, with the Reward winners returned, Jeff Probst brought Terry back to the camp from Exile Island and revealed that as a result of Bruce's withdrawal, there was no immunity challenge nor Tribal Council, and Bruce would assume a position on the Jury if his condition allowed.
179	12	"Perilous Scramble"	April 27, 2006	17.09	5.9/18
The other players continued to worry about Shane's strange behavior: he had found a piece of wood and was pretending it was his BlackBerry and he was sending messages to people back home.: Reward challenge: The tribe will be divided into two teams of three. Each team member will be attached to a rope that spans the length of an obstacle course. They must follow the rope while navigating the various obstacles. When the final platform is reached, they will unclip from the rope and, one at a time, race across a lily pad run, jump into the water and retrieve one of three bags. Once all three bags have been retrieved, they will clip onto the rope again and make their way back through all the obstacles to the beach. The first team to reach the finish with all three members and all three bags wins a barbecue feast. The winners of the barbecue feast would advance to a second challenge, firing marbles using a slingshot. The first castaway to break three tiles would receive a new car (a GMC Yukon).; Terry, Courtney and Danielle won the first part of the reward challenge, and Terry won the second part to claim the car. During their reward, Terry made a deal with Courtney and Danielle for the three of them to work together. Back at camp, Cirie went fishing and caught a sizable fish. After returning to camp, Danielle told Terry she was worried that if they were in the final three with Courtney, she figured he would pick Courtney to go to the final two with because she was less popular. Terry made an agreement with Danielle that if either of them won the final immunity challenge, they would take the second place winner to the final two. When Courtney was told of this, she became upset because she felt it implied she was being carried by other players.: Immunity challenge: Each tribe member will kneel at the end of a long plank suspended over a pit of water. The contestants will hold on to two ropes connected to a weighted hook. Starting with twenty percent of their body weight, the weight will increase by another ten percent every fifteen minutes. When the weight becomes too much to hold, the ropes will slip from their hands, the plank will give out and they'll fall into the water. The last person left standing wins Immunity.; Terry won his fourth straight immunity challenge, and the former Casaya alliance was forced to vote out one of their own. Shane thought the alliance was in agreement to vote out Danielle, while Courtney thought that her new alliance with Danielle, Terry and fourth member Cirie was voting against Aras. Cirie, who didn't like her low position in this alliance, worked with Aras and Danielle to vote against Courtney. At Tribal Council, Bruce appeared with the jury members, meaning he had recovered and was fit to continue as a juror. The final six were happy that he was okay. With the votes split three ways, Courtney was blindsided 3–2–1.
180	13	"Bamboozled"	May 4, 2006	17.04	5.9/18
Reward challenge: The castaways will dig in a circle of sand, each looking for a bag. The first four to find their bag move on to the second round. In the second round, they will carry their bags with them to untie a wooden snake. The first three to get to the finish with both bag and snake proceed to the third round. The third round, they will carry the bag and snake as they race over a sand hill and into a water pit, where they will untie a large fish. The first two to get to the finish with fish, bag and snake will move on to the final round. In the last round, the last two standing will go head to head, carrying all three items that they have collected through a series of wooden tunnels and towers. The first person to the finish wins a hotel accommodation with their loved one.; Players competed in a reward challenge of obstacles from past challenges for a visit with loved ones. The winner would decide as to what capacity the other contestants would get to interact with their loved ones. Terry narrowly claimed victory over Aras and choose himself and his wife, along with Shane and his son, Boston, to spend the night at a villa. He also chose Cirie's husband H.B. to spend the night at the camp, Aras to just get a hug from his mother and Danielle to get a few words with her mom from where she was standing.: Immunity challenge: Each tribe member will stand on a very small perch at the top of a 20-foot pole in the water. When the game begins, they will lower a bucket into the water to fill it, then pour from the bucket into a very narrow bamboo shoot. As the bamboo shoot fills up with water, it will raise a flag. Once the flag is high enough to reach, they must carefully grab it and raise it above their head in order to win Immunity.; After the loved ones left, the players competed for immunity. For the fifth time in a row, Terry won immunity. Back at camp, Aras decided to break his alliance with Shane after finding out that Shane wanted to take Courtney to the final two. Aras confirmed his alliance with Cirie and Danielle. In the end, Shane was blindsided in a 3–1–1 decision.
181	14	"Call the Whambulence!"	May 11, 2006	17.20	5.8/18
Terry was inadvertently tripped by Cirie's torch and yelled at her while she was tending the bonfire, but Aras protected her, saying that it was an accident. This left Terry further isolated among the tribe.: Reward challenge: The castaways will each be attached to ropes by one of two carabiners. Using the two carabiners, they will clip and unclasp from one rope to another as they navigate their way around each other along a main thoroughfare that leads to six stations: poles, hermit crabs, rocks, iguanas, shells and fish. Each time they get to a station they must count the number of items, race back to the start, and find the answer tile with the same number on it. Once they've been to all six stations, they will have six numbers. They will then place those six numbers into an answer grid. Using the combination, the two numbers in each column will open the locks. If the lock doesn't open, it means they've counted wrong and they can go back and correct their mistakes. Once they've opened all three locks, their tribe flag will drop. The first person to lower their tribe flag wins a luxury yacht tour of the Panama Canal.; Aras won the reward challenge, and chose to take Cirie on a luxurious yacht trip through the Panama Canal; but not before having a debate with Terry after he accused him of complaining every time he lost a challenge and blurting out "disparaging comments about women." Both Terry and Danielle were sent to Exile Island for losing the challenge. During their trip, Aras and Cirie made a pact for the Final 2; while Danielle and Terry also conspired for their fate in the game during their time on exile. Soon after returning from their reward, Cirie successfully built her first fire.: Immunity challenge: Each Survivor will work to solve three puzzles. Using a set of coordinates, each castaway will cross two ropes. Where the ropes intersect, a bag of puzzle pieces is buried in the sand. They must dig up the pieces, then race back to their respective answer boards to complete their puzzle. The puzzle will reveal the next set of coordinates. The first person to solve all three puzzles, with the third one reading "Safe From Vote," wins Immunity.; In the immunity challenge, Cirie and Terry were putting up a good fight but Aras ultimately won the challenge, thus ending Terry's Immunity winning streak. Before the tribal council, Aras approached Terry to apologize for accusations of Terry's worthiness to remain in the game after the reward challenge, which Terry accepted. Meanwhile, Cirie and Danielle practiced making fire, anticipated this would be the tiebreaker in the event of a tie (with Danielle reconsidering about Terry giving his hidden immunity idol to her). In the end, the guess proved accurate as the vote indeed ended up tied between Danielle and Cirie. With Terry refusing to give Danielle the hidden immunity idol, she and Cirie will partake in a fire-starting challenge.
182	15	"The Final Showdown"	May 14, 2006	17.07	6.2/15
After many attempts to start fires that continued to wear out, Danielle won the fire starting tie-breaker, and Cirie was eliminated from the game.: Reward challenge: The Survivors must race to the top of a three-story climbing wall using four individually shaped pegs. First, they must make their way through a table maze. Once at the end of the maze, each will release a bag containing their first two pegs and move to a spinning wheel. Reading the clues, each must spin the wheel clockwise, counter-clockwise, and clockwise again like a combination lock to find the one bag that contains their final two pegs. With the help of the pegs, the players must get to the top of the wall and place their pegs in the proper slots, which will raise a flag. The first person to raise their flag wins a protein-enriched meal.; The next morning, Terry displayed the now powerless immunity idol back at camp, and in a surprise reward challenge, he won a protein-enriched meal that would be useful for the final immunity challenge. The final three were taken to Exile Island to take part in a tribute to the eliminated Survivors. The three placed the extinguished torches of the thirteen eliminated Survivors on the large skull-shaped shelter in the center of the island and burned it in the process.: Immunity challenge: Starting on the largest of a series of floating platforms, every fifteen minutes the Final Three will move to the next smaller platform. As the platforms get smaller, it will get tougher for the Survivors to maintain their balance. Only their feet can touch the platform. If their hands or butt touch the platform or they fall off, they are eliminated. The last person standing wins Immunity.; Danielle won the final immunity after Terry fell off and Aras jumped off after receiving a nod from Danielle. Danielle voted out Terry, thinking that she would have a better chance of winning against Aras, and because Aras was a fellow member of the former Casaya tribe. With all of the other castaways gone, Aras and Danielle received a celebratory food reward the next day. While walking along the beach rocks, Aras slipped and sliced open his hand and back, requiring a total of eight stitches. At the final Tribal Council, Jeff first asked Aras about the injury and Aras explained about it. Aras's opening statement was thanking the jury and he hopes that they jury vote by how he played the game. He also states the he played the game with honesty and integrity for the most part. Danielle also thanks the jury for the experience. She stated that she wanted to do the best that she could do. Danielle hopes that the jury makes the right decision. Sally was the first to speak. She congratulated the finalists and asked of the Casaya 6, who contributed the most. Both finalists said Cirie because of their friendships with her. Bruce was next to speak. He bows to the finalists and congratulated them. He asked what would the finalists do with the responsibility of the million dollars. Aras said to make himself a better person to inspire people. Danielle said to give speeches with others to encourage them. Terry was the third to speak and called Danielle's speech off based. He elaborates on this and hopes she doesn't regret not taking him to Final Tribal Council. His question to the finalists was to rank themselves from 1-10 and why. Aras said 9 because he would work his butt off in challenges. Danielle 8 1/2 to 9 because of she gave the challenges her all and regrets eating the cheeseburgers. Austin congratulated the finalists and felt sorry for Aras. He asks for one good move and one not so good move that helped them get to Final Tribal Council. Danielle said that her move was convincing people to not vote out Bruce. Her other move was voting out Courtney. Aras said that his move was calming Shane and telling Melinda Hyder she was going so she wouldn't be blindsided. The move he regretted was blindsiding Shane. Courtney was the next to speak. She said that her guns were dropped in the sea of forgiveness. Courtney said she struggled with playing her integrity and it took her a week to get over the betrayal of her blindside. After completing her speech, Courtney asked the finalists what the finalists learned about themselves. Aras pointed out that she voted against him at her last Tribal Council, but takes responsibility. He said that his ego was smashed. Danielle said that she was mentally stronger, but Courtney put that as her own words. Courtney makes one last speech before sitting down. Cirie asks the final two why she should vote for the other one. Danielle said Aras is an overall great person. Aras said that Danielle was there for them when he was injured. Shane congratulated the finalists but states he was disappointed that they were the final two because Terry was the most deserving. Shane lists off the reasons why they were undeserving. When his was done, Shane ask the finalists a number between one and a million. Aras said four, while Danielle said ten. In her closing statements, Danielle said she wanted to be strong and be herself. She felt like played the game with honesty and intregrity and disagreed with Shane's statement. Danielle hopes the jury votes for her on the outwit, outplay and outlast part of the game. Aras said that he worked hard in the game and he apologized to Shane. He thanks the jury for being a part of his jury experience. Bruce votes for Danielle because of the experience they shared. Terry voted Aras because he was a worthy rival. Jeff takes the votes with him.
183	16	"Reunion"	May 14, 2006	11.65	4.6/
Months later, it was revealed that Aras won, crowning him as the twelfth Sole Survivor, in a 5–2 vote over Danielle. The castaways discussed the season with host, Jeff Probst, live at the Ed Sullivan Theater in New York City.

== Voting history ==
Survivor: Panama voting history
	Original tribes	Switched tribes					Merged tribe								
Episode	1	2	3	4	5	6	8	9	10	11	12	13	14	15	
Day	3	6	8	11	14	15	18	21	24	25	30	33	36		38
Tribe	Casaya	Casaya	La Mina	La Mina	Casaya	La Mina	Gitanos	Gitanos	Gitanos	Gitanos	Gitanos	Gitanos	Gitanos		Gitanos
Eliminated	Tina	Melinda	Misty	Ruth Marie	Bobby	Dan	Nick	Austin	Sally	Bruce	Courtney	Shane	Tie (Note: The first Tribal Council vote resulted in a tie. As there were only four castaways remaining, the two tied castaways competed in a fire-making challenge to resolve the tie.)	Cirie	Terry
Votes	3–1	5–2	5–2	4–2	3–2–1–1	3–1	6–4	6–3	6–2	Evacuated (Note: No vote; Bruce was medically evacuated from the game.)	3–2–1	3–1–1	2–2	Challenge (Note: Cirie lost to Danielle in a fire-making challenge.)	1–0
Voter	Vote														
Aras		Melinda			Bruce		Nick	Austin	Sally		Courtney	Shane	Danielle		None (Note: Aras and Terry were not eligible to vote as the only eligible players they could vote for were each other.)
Danielle		Melinda			Bobby		Nick	Austin	Sally		Courtney	Shane	Cirie	Won	Terry
Terry			Misty	Ruth Marie		Dan	Shane	Aras	Aras		Aras	Aras	Cirie		None
Cirie	Tina	Shane			Bobby		Nick	Austin	Sally		Courtney	Shane	Danielle	Lost	
Shane		Melinda			Aras		Nick	Austin	Sally		Danielle	Danielle			
Courtney		Melinda			Bobby		Nick	Austin	Sally		Aras				
Bruce		Exiled (Note: Bruce was sent to Exile Island after not being chosen in the tribal switch. He joined the tribe that lost the subsequent immunity challenge, Casaya.)			Courtney		Nick	Austin	Sally	Evacuated					
Sally			Ruth Marie	Ruth Marie		Exiled (Note: Sally was exiled until after the next Tribal Council, which meant she could not be voted out or participate in the vote.)	Shane	Aras	Aras						
Austin			Misty	Ruth Marie		Dan	Shane	Aras							
Nick			Misty	Ruth Marie		Dan	Shane								
Dan			Misty	Sally		Austin									
Bobby		Melinda			Bruce										
Ruth Marie	Tina		Misty	Sally											
Misty			Ruth Marie												
Melinda	Tina	Shane													
Tina	Cirie														

Jury vote
Episode	16	
Day	39	
Finalist	Aras	Danielle
Vote	5–2	
Juror	Vote	
Terry	Yes	
Cirie	Yes	
Shane		Yes
Courtney	Yes	
Bruce		Yes
Sally	Yes	
Austin	Yes	

== Reception ==
Survivor: Panama has received mixed to positive reviews from fans and critics. The personalities of the Casaya tribe members, in particular fan-favorite Cirie Fields, were praised. However, aside from Terry Deitz, the members of the La Mina tribe was criticized for being perceived as less entertaining compared to their Casaya counterparts. As such, critics believe that the season is uneven due to the contrast in entertainment between the members of the two main tribes. Dalton Ross of Entertainment Weekly ranked this season 27th out of 40 criticizing the season's final immunity challenge for being unfair to Terry Deitz which led to an "unmemorable" final two. The gameplay of winner Aras Baskauskas received mixed to negative reception. Baskauskas placed 23rd out of the first 34 winners in a fan poll conducted by Entertainment Weekly in 2017 and also received the fewest first-place votes out of every winner in the poll. In 2014, Joe Reid of The Wire ranked this season 8th out of 27. In 2015, a poll by Rob Has a Podcast ranked this season 12th out of 30 with Rob Cesternino ranking this season 14th. This was updated in 2021 during Cesternino's podcast, Survivor All-Time Top 40 Rankings, ranking 15th out of 40. In 2020, The "Purple Rock Podcast" ranked this season 10th out of 40 saying the "casting here is good" and the "gameplay is almost more interesting for what doesn’t happen than what does". Later that same year, Inside Survivor ranked this season 12th out of 40 saying it is a GREAT season that "features some of the best characters of all-time, has innovative gameplay, superb blindsides, an underdog story, and is perhaps the funniest season ever." In 2024, Nick Caruso of TVLine ranked this season 28th out of 47.
