= Brock string =

Instrument used in vision therapy

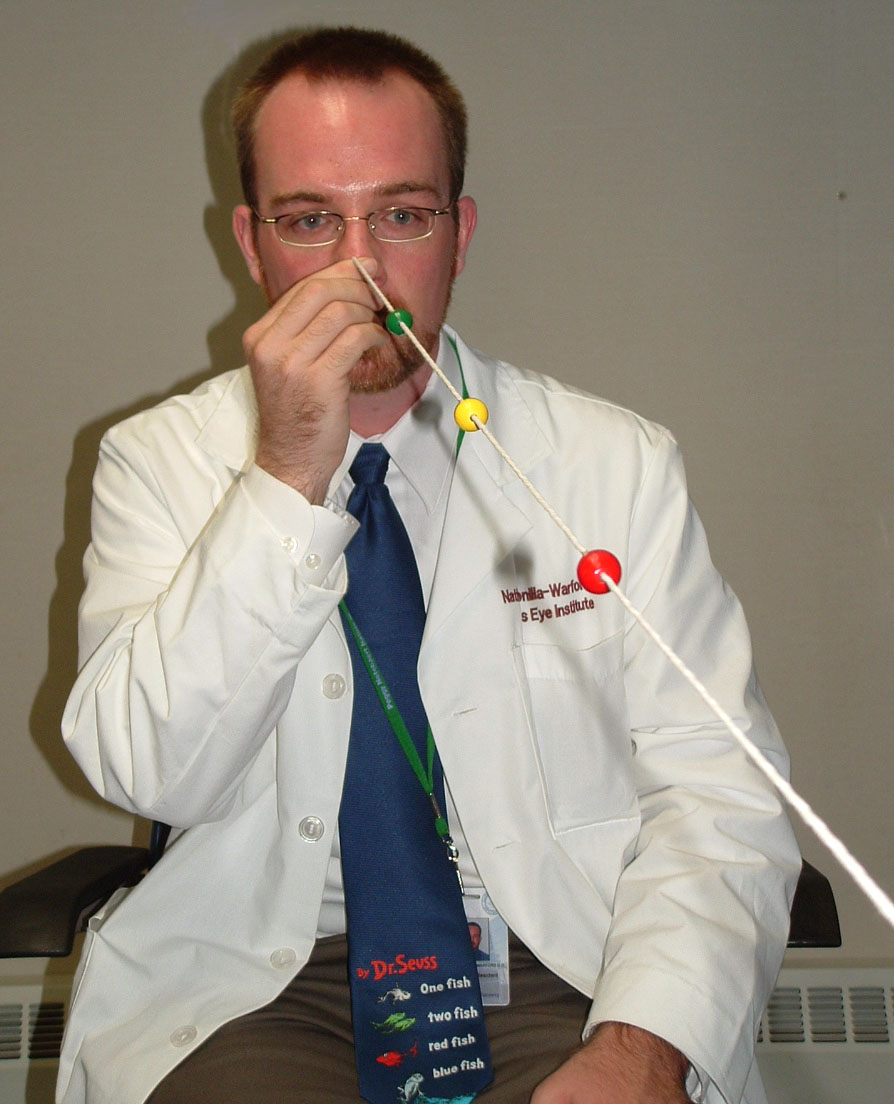
A Brock string in use.

A Brock string (named after Frederick W. Brock) is an instrument used in vision therapy. It consists of a white string of approximately 10 feet in length with three small wooden beads of different colors.

The Brock string is commonly employed during treatment of convergence insufficiency and other anomalies of binocular vision. It is used to develop skills of convergence as well as to disrupt suppression of one of the eyes.

During therapy, the one end of the Brock string is held on the tip of the nose while the other is tied to a fixed point. The three beads are spaced out at various distances. The patient is asked to focus on one of the beads, while noting the visual input of each eye and sensation of convergence. The patient can use variable techniques to make easier or more difficult by bringing the beads closer/further to the nose and by employing lenses and prisms.
