= Optometric Extension Program =

The Optometric Extension Program Foundation (OEPF) is an international, non-profit organization dedicated to the advancement of the discipline of optometry, with recent emphasis on behavioral optometry and vision therapy. The OEPF produces the monthly Optometry & Visual Performance (OVP) journal, and previously published the Journal of Behavioral Optometry. OEPF also reprints writings and lectures relating to vision.

The OEP Foundation has its origins in a continuing education post graduate program developed by the Oklahoma Optometric Association for its members in the 1920s. Optometrists E.B. Alexander (the secretary of the Oklahoma Extension Program) and A.M. Skeffington ("the father of behavioral optometry") have been credited as establishing the OEP Foundation in 1928. The OEP Foundation began with 51 members and has developed into an international organization with 12,000+ participants. It offers a certification program for optometrists and therapists.
