= Malakhera railway station =

Railway station in Rajasthan, India

Malakhera

General information
- Location: Malakhera, Alwar district, Rajasthan; India
- Coordinates: 27.390051°N 76.619012°E
- Elevation: 264 metres (866 ft)
- System: Indian Railways station
- Owner: Indian Railways
- Operator: North Western Railway
- Line: Delhi–Jaipur line
- Platforms: 2
- Tracks: 2

Construction
- Structure type: Standard (on ground station)
- Parking: Yes

Other information
- Status: Functioning
- Station code: MKH
- Zone(s): North Western Railway
- Division(s): Jaipur
Location
- Location within India Location within Rajasthan

Malakhera railway station is a railway station in Alwar district, Rajasthan. Its code is MKH. It serves Malakhera. The station consists of 2 platforms. Passenger, Express trains halt here.

The most popular Bollywood movie Karan Arjun which released in the year 1995. Some portion of the movie shoot in this malakhera railway station.
