= Medical consensus =

Medical consensus is a public statement on a particular aspect of medical knowledge at the time the statement is made that a representative group of experts agree to be evidence-based and state-of-the-art (state-of-the-science) knowledge. Its main objective is to counsel physicians on the best possible and acceptable way to diagnose and treat certain diseases or how to address a particular decision-making area. It is usually, therefore, considered an authoritative, community-based expression of a consensus decision-making and publication process.

== Methods ==
There are many ways of producing medical consensus, but the most usual way is to convene an independent panel of experts, either by a medical association or by a governmental authority.

Since consensus statements provide a "snapshot in time" of the state of knowledge in a particular topic, they must periodically be re-evaluated and published again, replacing the previous consensus statement.

Consensus statements differ from medical guidelines, another form of state-of-the-science public statements. According to the NIH, "Consensus statements synthesize new information, largely from recent or ongoing medical research, that has implications for reevaluation of routine medical practices. They do not give specific algorithms or guidelines for practice."

== History ==
From 1977 to 2013, the National Institutes of Health (United States) promoted about five to six consensus panels per year, and organized this knowledge by means of a special Consensus Development Program, managed by the NIH's Office of Disease Prevention (ODP). It was retired in 2013 in deference to other agencies and organizations that had picked up the lead, such as the U.S. Preventive Services Task Force, the Community Preventive Services Task Force, Institute of Medicine, and Cochrane. Its archive is available in printed form as well as for downloading from the Internet.

== See also ==
- Medical decision making
- Evidence-based medicine
- Medical literature
- Medical research
- Guideline (medical)
- Journal Club
- Algorithm (medical)
- Scientific consensus
