= Journal of Behavioral Optometry =

- Discipline: Optometry
- Language: English
- Edited by: Marc Taub

Publication details
- History: 1990-2013
- Publisher: Optometric Extension Program Foundation
- Frequency: Bimonthly

Standard abbreviations
- ISO 4: J. Behav. Optom.

Indexing
- ISSN: 1045-8395
- OCLC no.: 20268909

Links
- Journal homepage

The Journal of Behavioral Optometry was a peer-reviewed medical journal published by the Optometric Extension Program Foundation. It covered clinically relevant behavioral, functional, and developmental aspects of the visual system. It included the following categories of articles:

- clinical case reports
- preliminary and completed clinically relevant research reports
- speculative reports of new and adapted clinical diagnostic and therapeutic measures
- literature reviews
- guest editorials
- essays
- viewpoint articles

It was discontinued in 2012 in favour of the new journal Optometry & Visual Performance.
