= Vision therapy =

Alternative medicine treatment using eye exercises aimed at improving sight

- Specialty: Optometry

Vision therapy (VT), or behavioral optometry, is an umbrella term for alternative medicine treatments using eye exercises, based around the pseudoscientific claim that vision problems are the true underlying cause of learning difficulties, particularly in children. Vision therapy has not been shown to be effective using scientific studies, except for helping with convergence insufficiency. Most claims—for example, that the therapy can address neurological, educational, and spatial difficulties—lack supporting evidence. Neither the American Academy of Pediatrics nor the American Academy of Ophthalmology support the use of vision therapy.

== Definition and conceptual basis ==
Behavioral vision therapy is based on the proposition that many learning disabilities in children are based on vision problems, and that these can be cured by performing eye exercises. Behavioral vision therapy lacks sound evidence, has been characterized as a pseudoscience and its practice as quackery.

Vision therapy is a broad concept that encompasses a wide range of treatment types. These include those aimed at convergence insufficiency – where it is often termed "vergence therapy", "orthoptics/vision therapy" or "orthoptic therapy" – and at a variety of neurological, educational and spatial difficulties.

== Efficacy ==
There is no good evidence that behavioral vision therapy is of any benefit in treating learning disabilities, reading, dyslexia, or ADHD. However, there is evidence that orthoptic vision therapy may help treat convergence disorder in healthy people. As of 2020, the consensus among ophthalmologists, orthoptists and pediatricians is that non-strabismic visual therapy lacks documented evidence of effectiveness.

A review in 2000 concluded that there were insufficient controlled studies of the approach of behavioral vision therapy. A 2008 review of the literature also noted that there were insufficient controlled studies of behavioral vision therapy, and concluded that the approaches "are not evidence-based, and thus cannot be advocated."

There is no good evidence supporting the use of behavioral vision therapy in the rehabilitation of patients with mild traumatic brain injury, although orthoptic vision therapy may be useful for the treatment of post-traumatic convergence insufficiency and accommodative insufficiency.

== Treatment types ==
There exist a few different broad classifications of vision treatment philosophies, which have been traditionally divided between optometrists, ophthalmologists, and practitioners of alternative medicine.

Orthoptic vision therapy, also known as orthoptics, is a field pertaining to the evaluation and treatment of patients with disorders of the visual system with an emphasis on binocular vision and eye movements. Commonly practiced by orthoptists, optometrists, behavioral optometrists, pediatric ophthalmologists, and general ophthalmologists, traditional orthoptics addresses problems of eye strain, visually induced headaches, strabismus, diplopia and visual-related skills required for reading.

Behavioral vision therapy, or visual integration vision therapy (also known as behavioral optometry), is a pseudoscientific field pertaining to the treatment of patients with various psychological disorders, such as dyslexia, developmental coordination disorder, attention deficit hyperactivity disorder, among other learning disorders via orthoptic techniques. There is currently insufficient evidence to support behavioral vision therapy as a treatment for these conditions, and it is typically regarded as pseudoscientific.

=== Orthoptic vision therapy ===
Orthoptics emphasises the diagnosis and non-surgical management of strabismus (wandering eye), amblyopia (lazy eye), and eye movement disorders. Evidence to support its use in treating amblyopia is unclear as of 2011.

Much of the practice of orthoptists concerns refraction and muscular eye control. Orthoptists are trained professionals who specialize in orthoptic treatment. With specific training, in some countries orthoptists may be involved in monitoring some forms of eye disease, such as glaucoma, cataract screening, and diabetic retinopathy.

=== Behavioral vision therapy ===
Behavioral vision therapy (BVT) aims to treat problems including difficulties of visual attention and concentration, which behavioral optometrists classify as visual information processing weaknesses. These manifest themselves as an inability to sustain focus or to shift focus from one area of space to another. Some practitioners assert that poor eye tracking may impact reading skills, and suggest that vision training may improve some of the visual skills helpful for reading.

Behavioral vision therapy is practiced primarily by optometrists who specialize in the area. Historically, there has been some difference in philosophy among optometry and medicine regarding the efficacy and relevance of vision therapy, although none support its use in treating learning disorders. Major organizations, including the International Orthoptic Association and the American Academy of Ophthalmology, have concluded that there is no validity for clinically significant improvements in vision with BVT, and therefore do not practice it. However, major optometric organizations, including the American Optometric Association, the American Academy of Optometry, the College of Optometrists in Vision Development, and the Optometric Extension Program, support the assertion that non-strabismic visual therapy does address underlying visual problems which are claimed to affect learning potential. These optometric organizations are careful to distinguish, though, that vision therapy does not directly treat learning disorders.

==== Behavioral optometry ====
Behavioral optometry is a scientifically unproven branch of optometry that explores how visual function influences a patient's day-to-day activities. Behavioral vision therapy is a subset of behavioral optometry. In general, vision therapists attempt to improve the vision, and therefore day-to-day well-being, of patients using "eye exercises," prism, and lenses, with more emphasis on the patient's visual function.

Among schools of medicine, neither ophthalmology nor psychology see merit in the procedures surrounding many of behavioral optometry's practices, as there have not been enough studies of high enough rigor to warrant practicing behavioral vision therapy. According to the American Association for Pediatric Ophthalmology and Strabismus, the behavioral aspects of vision therapy are considered scientifically unproven.

===== Techniques =====
In 2008, vision scientist Brendan Barrett published a review of behavioral optometry at the invitation of the UK College of Optometrists. He wrote that behavioral optometry was not a well-defined field but that proponents believed it could go beyond standard programmes, like an extension to optometry, taking a holistic approach. Barrett enumerated the therapies:

- Vision therapy for accommodation/vergence disorders – eye exercises and training to try and alleviate these disorders. There is evidence that convergence disorders may be helped by eye exercises, but no good evidence exists that exercises help with accommodation disorders.
- The underachieving child – therapies claimed to help children with dyslexia, dyspraxia and attention deficit disorder – a "vulnerable" target market. There is no evidence that behavioral optometry is of any benefit in relation to these conditions.
- Prisms for near binocular disorders and for producing postural change – the use of "yoked" prisms to redirect a person's gaze and bring about a range of claimed benefits including postural improvements and increased wellbeing. There is a lack of evidence for the effect this approach may have.
- Near point stress and low-plus – the use of special lenses to adjust near-field vision, even for people who would not normally need glasses. This is claimed to bring about postural benefits and relieve visual stress. Some research has been carried out in this area and its effectiveness remains "unproven".
- Use of low-plus lenses at near to slow the progression of myopia.
- Therapy to reduce myopia.
- Behavioural approaches to the treatment of strabismus and amblyopia.
- Training central and peripheral awareness and syntonic.
- Sports vision therapy.
- Neurological disorders and neurorehabilitation after trauma/stroke.

Barrett noted the lack of published controlled trials of the techniques. He found that there are a few areas where the available evidence suggest that the approach might have some value, namely in the treatment of convergence insufficiency, the use of yoked prisms in neurological patients, and in vision rehabilitation after brain disease or injury—but he found that in the other areas where the techniques have been used, i.e., the majority of situations, there is no evidence of their value. In contrast, Steven Novella points out that the only condition for which there is good quality scientific evidence is convergence disorders. This points out a problem that is common with Complementary or integrative medicine, a type of Alternative medicine, is that a promising use for treating a single disorder is applied to a wide range of disorders for which there is no evidence.

===== Eye exercises =====
The eye exercises used in vision therapy can generally be divided into two groups: those employed for "strabismic" outcomes and those employed for "non-strabismic" outcomes, to improve eye health. Ophthalmologists and orthoptists do not endorse these exercises as having clinically significant validity for improvements in vision. Usually, they see these perceptual-motor activities being in the sphere of either speech therapy or occupational therapy.

Some of the exercises used are:

- Near the point of convergence training, or the ability for both eyes to focus on a single point in space.
- Base-out prism reading, stereogram cards, computerized training programs are used to improve fusional vergence.
- The wearing of convex lenses.
- The wearing of concave lenses.
- "Cawthorne Cooksey Exercises" also employ various eye exercises, however, these are designed to alleviate vestibular disorders, such as dizziness, rather than eye problems.
- Antisuppression exercises for amblyopia - this is no longer commonly practiced, although occasionally it may be used.

Eye exercises used in behavioural vision therapy, also known as developmental optometry, aim to treat problems, including difficulties of visual attention and concentration, which are purported to manifest themselves as an inability to sustain focus or to shift focus from one area of space to another.

Some of the exercises use:

- Marsden balls
- Rotation trainers
- Syntonics
- Balance board or beams
- Saccadic fixators
- Directional sequencers

Fusional amplitude and relative fusional amplitude training are designed to alleviate convergence insufficiency. The CITT study (Convergence Insufficiency Treatment Trial) was a randomized, double-blind multi-center trial (high level of reliability) indicating that orthoptic vision therapy is an effective method of treatment of convergence insufficiency (CI). Both optometrists and ophthalmologists were coauthors of this study. Fusional amplitude training is also designed to alleviate intermittent exotropia and other less common forms of strabismus.

Certain do-it-yourself eye exercises are claimed by some to improve visual acuity by reducing or eliminating refractive errors. Such claims rely mainly on anecdotal evidence, and are not generally endorsed by orthoptists, ophthalmologists or optometrists.

The German optician Hans-Joachim Haase developed a method to correct an alleged misalignment. His method, called the MKH method, is not recognized as an evidence-based approach.

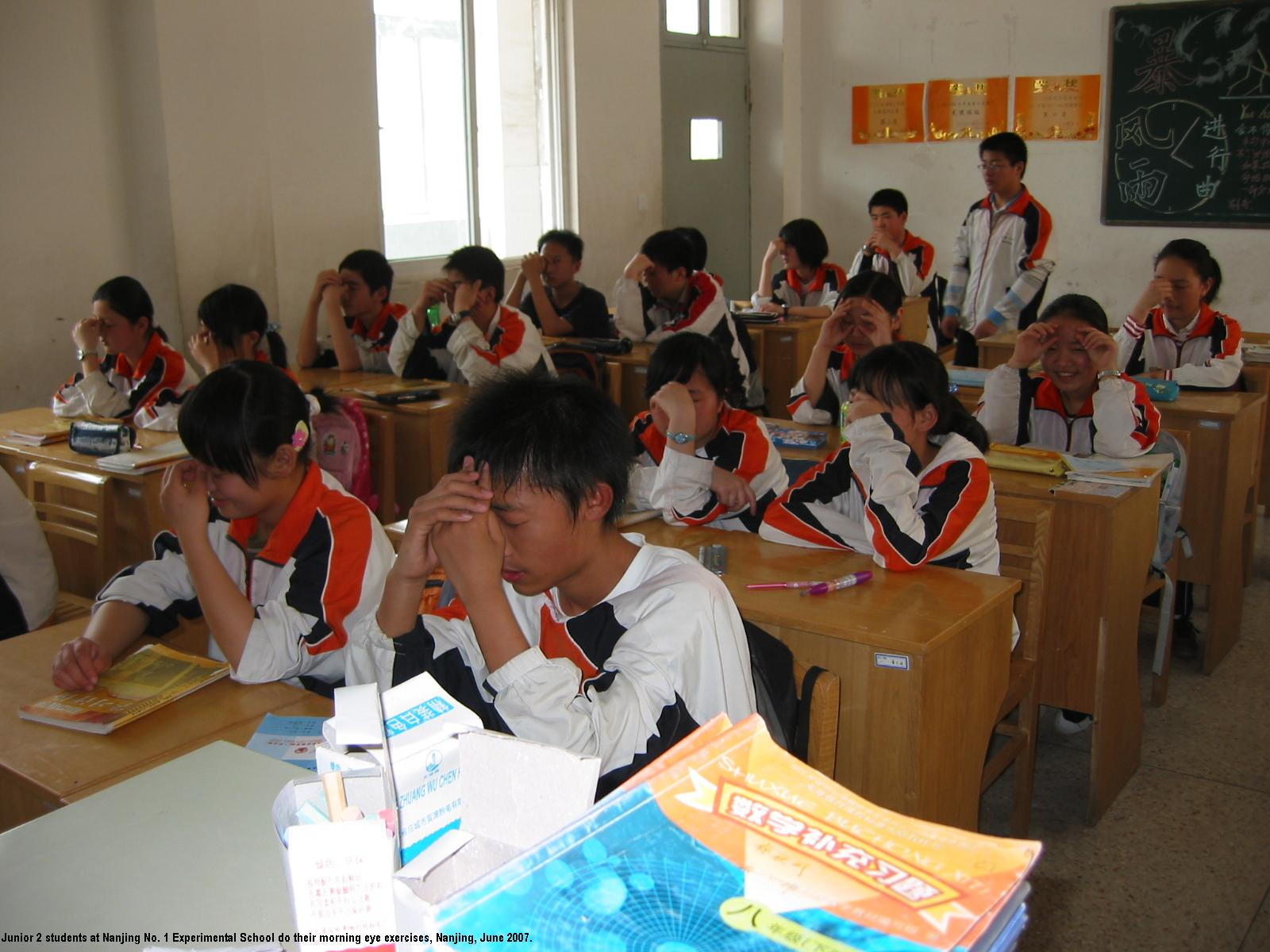
A class at Nanjing No. 1 Experimental School performs eye exercises (2007).

Beginning in the early 1960s, the Chinese government, concerned about the high incidence of nearsightedness among the Chinese population, undertook a programme to combat this problem. In 1963, the government began requiring schoolchildren between the ages of 6 and 17 to perform eye exercises at school. Ever since, this has been a common practice at schools in the People's Republic. The actual method used by the schoolchildren to exercise their eyes is based on traditional Chinese massage therapy, involving self-massage of acupoints around the eyes. The programme's effectiveness, however, is very much in question, given that over the same time as that in which there have been regular school eye exercises, the prevalence of nearsightedness among Chinese children, quite contrarily to the government's intended goal, has risen significantly.

===== Conceptual basis and effectiveness =====
Behavioral optometry is largely based on concepts that lack plausibility or which contradict mainstream neurology, and most of the research done has been of poor quality. As with chiropractic, there seems to be a spectrum of scientific legitimacy among practitioners: at one extreme there is some weak evidence in support of the idea that myopia may be affected by eye training; at the other extreme are concepts such as "syntonic phototherapy" which proposes that differently colored lights can be used to treat a variety of medical conditions.

A review in 2000 concluded that there were insufficient controlled studies of the approach. In 2008 Barrett concluded that "the continued absence of rigorous scientific evidence to support behavioural management approaches, and the paucity of controlled trials, in particular, represents a major challenge to the credibility of the theory and practice of behavioural optometry."

Behavioral optometry has been proposed as being of benefit for children with attention deficit hyperactivity disorder and autism – this proposal is based on the idea that since people with these conditions often have abnormal eye movement, correcting this may address the underlying condition. Evidence supporting this approach is, however, weak; the American Academy of Pediatrics, the American Academy of Ophthalmology and the American Association for Pediatric Ophthalmology and Strabismus have said that learning disabilities are neither caused nor treatable by visual methods.

=== Sports vision training ===
Practitioners of sports vision training claim to be able to enhance the function of an athlete's vision beyond what is expected in individuals with already healthy visual systems.

== History ==
Various forms of eye exercises have been used for centuries. The concept of orthoptics was introduced in the late nineteenth century for the non-surgical treatment of strabismus. This early and traditional form of vision therapy was the foundation of what is now known as orthoptics and was based on observation not research or evidence.

In the first half of the twentieth century, orthoptists, working with ophthalmologists, introduced a variety of training techniques mainly designed to improve ocular alignment. In the second half of the twentieth century, vision therapy began to be used by specially trained optometrists to treat conditions ranging from uncomfortable vision (asthenopia), ocular motor skills, focusing control, binocular vision, depth perception, eye-hand coordination and visual processing. These treatments have been demonstrated to help many patients with poor reading and academic performance caused by their vision. There are many unscientific techniques promoted commercially and claimed specifically to improve eyesight and even to improve athletic performance.

=== Behavioral optometry ===
Behavioral optometry is considered by some optometrists to have its origins in the teachings of Skeffington and Alexander. They promoted continuing education for optometrists to further their knowledge of how vision impacts performance. Vision therapy is differentiated between strabismic/orthoptic vision therapy (which many optometrists, orthoptists and ophthalmologists practice) and non-strabismic vision therapy. A.M. Skeffington was an American optometrist known to some as "the father of behavioral optometry". Skeffington has been credited as co-founding the Optometric Extension Program with E.B. Alexander in 1928.

== See also ==
- Bates method
- Irlen syndrome
- Journal of Behavioral Optometry
- Reichian therapy
- Visual Snow
