= Haploscope =

Optical device

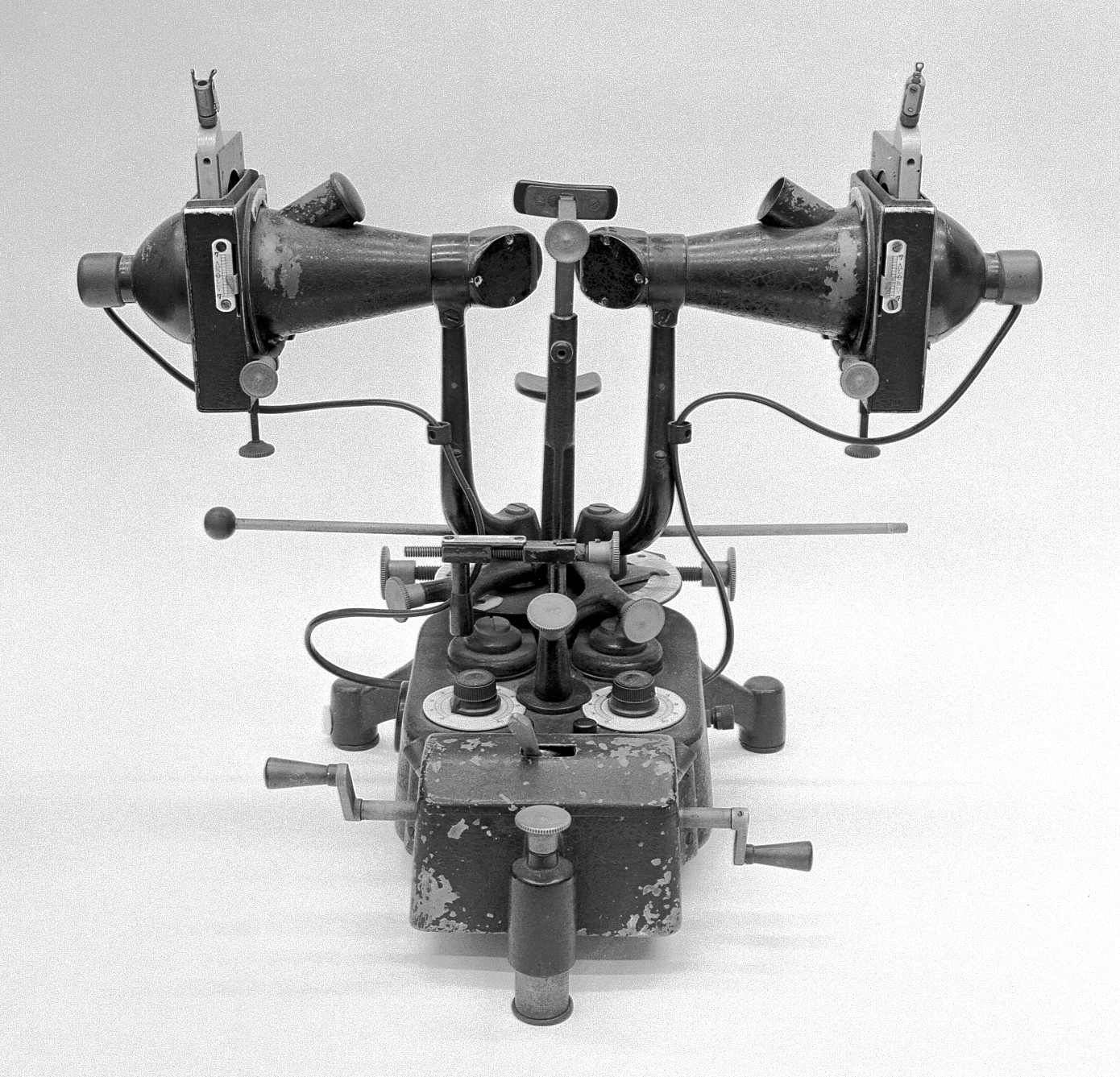
Synotophore by Walter Green with Sharp-Crawford rotating slide holders

A haploscope is an optical device for presenting one image to one eye and another image to the other eye. The word derives from two Greek roots: haploieides, single and skopeo, to view. The word is often used interchangeably with stereoscope, but it is more general than that. A stereoscope is a type of haploscope, but not vice versa. The word has more currency in the medical field than elsewhere, where it refers to instruments designed to test binocular vision. These instruments include Worth's amblyoscope and the synoptophore.

Commonly haploscopes employ front-surfaced mirrors placed at different angles close to the eyes to reflect the images into the eyes. Reputedly the largest haploscope, with images of over a meter (in fact, 4 feet) square and a viewing distance for each eye of nearly five meters (16 feet), was constructed by Vaegan in about 1975 to research stereoacuity. The large images allowed very small retinal disparities to be presented.

== See also ==
- Cheiroscope
- Diplopia
- Amblyopia
- Orthoptist
