= Management of strabismus =

Use of drugs or surgery to treat the misalignment of the eyes

- Specialty: Ophthalmology

The management of strabismus may include the use of drugs or surgery to correct the strabismus. Agents used include paralytic agents such as botox used on extraocular muscles, topical autonomic nervous system agents to alter the refractive index in the eyes, and agents that act in the central nervous system to correct amblyopia.

Strabismus is a misalignment of the eyes and may also result in amblyopia (lazy eye) or impairments of binocular vision.

== Medication ==
Pharmacologic injection treatments can be given to cooperative adults under local anesthesia in an outpatient setting, and for some agents, under light general anesthesia. In the former case, it is possible to bring the injection needle to an optimal location in the desired muscle using EMG guidance as the alert patient looks in diagnostic directions, the needle is advanced until the electromyogram (the electrical signal from an activated skeletal muscle) indicates it is optimally positioned, whereupon the injection is completed. Some agents (e.g., botulinum toxin) can be injected at the insertional end of a muscle under visual guidance, using special forceps and allowed to diffuse posteriorly, whereas others (e.g., bupivacaine) must be distributed throughout the body of the muscle, which requires non-visual guidance. EMG guidance generally provides more effective injections, but is only suitable for alert, cooperative adults. Because injection treatment does not result in the scarring that is often a troublesome consequence of conventional strabismus surgery, if therapeutic goals are not achieved with one injection, additional injections or surgical treatments can readily be given.

Replacement of strabismus surgery with less invasive procedures began in Alan B Scott's San Francisco lab with his development of botulinum toxin injection treatment.

Some forms of strabismus can be corrected by weakening an extraocular muscle. Botulinum toxin blocks the neuromuscular transmission and thus paralyzes injected muscles. Paralysis is temporary, and it might seem that injections would always need to be repeated, except that muscles adapt to the lengths at which they are chronically held, so that a paralyzed muscle tends to get stretched-out by its antagonist and grows longer by addition of serial sarcomeres (the contractile units of skeletal muscles), while the antagonist tends to grow shorter by deletion of sarcomeres, thereby maintaining re-alignment when the toxin-caused paralysis has resolved. If there is good binocular vision, once muscular imbalance is sufficiently reduced, the brain mechanism of motor fusion (which points the eyes to a target visible to both) can stabilize eye alignment.

Botulinum A toxin (introduced as Oculinum), now called Botox, is the principal drug used to temporarily paralyze extraocular muscles, and is widely accepted as an alternative to surgery for many types of strabismus. Crotoxin, a snake neurotoxin, is being developed in Belo Horizonte, Brazil as a potential alternative.

=== Botulinum toxin ===
Botulinum toxin injection is commonly used for small and moderate degrees of infantile esotropia, acquired adult strabismus, and where it is a consequence of retinal detachment surgery, that is, in cases where there is good potential for binocular vision, so that the corrected alignment can be stabilized by motor fusion. Sixth nerve palsy, paralysis of the lateral rectus, the muscle that rotates the eye outwards, is most frequently caused by an ischemic event, from which there is frequently substantial recovery. But during the acute stage of paresis, the lateral rectus is stretched and grows longer, and its antagonist medial rectus shortens. Sixth nerve palsy is treated by injecting the medial rectus muscle, thereby allowing the lateral rectus, paretic though it be, to stretch and lengthen the medial, while it shortens, so that, when the sixth nerve paresis subsides, alignment is improved. The toxin is also useful in other cranial nerve palsies affecting eye muscles. Residual misalignments that remain following traditional strabismus surgery can be corrected with toxin injection. Toxin injections are used for temporary relief during the acute phase of thyroid ophthalmopathy, when misalignments are too unstable to treat surgically. Botulinum toxin has also been used intraoperatively to augment a surgical effect. In complex strabismus cases, toxin can be injected diagnostically as an aid to planning surgical treatment.

The force exerted by a muscle is the sum of its contractile force ("active force", controlled mostly by neural innervation) and its elastic force ("passive" force, determined stretching). Both are affected by muscle length, which determines the degree of stretch in a given eye position. Botulinum toxin paralysis reduces total muscle force by removing, or reducing, the contractile component.

Botulinum toxin is a neurotoxin present in the cytoplasm of the anaerobic bacterium Clostridium botulinum. It binds presynaptically with high affinity to sites on cholinergic nerve terminals, decreasing release of acetylcholine, thereby blocking neuromuscular transmission, and causing flaccid muscle paralysis. Crotoxin appears to act similarly.

To weaken an eye muscle, 1 to 12 units (a few nanograms) of toxin are injected directly into it. The treated muscle weakens over 48–72 hours and remains paretic (partially paralyzed) for 2–4 months, at which time muscle length changes and motor fusion can stabilize the re-alignment.

==== Complications ====
Subconjunctival hemorrhage, ptosis (drooping eyelid) and vertical strabismus are the most common complications, most resolving within several weeks. Ptosis and vertical strabismus are caused by spreading of toxin to adjacent muscles, and their risk decreases with lower doses and more accurate injection techniques. Some overcorrections, such as exotropia (eyes deviated outward) following treatment for infantile esotropia, usually lead to good long-term alignment, and is only an apparent complication. Severe complications, such as globe perforation and retrobulbar hemorrhage are rare. No systemic side effects have been reported in patients treated for strabismus, nor has immunity to botulinum toxin developed, even after multiple injections.

=== Bupivacaine ===
Bupivacaine injection is currently the only pharmacologic treatment clinically shown to strengthen and shorten extraocular muscles. Myogenic growth factors (IGF and FGF) have only been tested in animals.

Long used as an anesthetic in cataract surgery, bupivacaine was found to sometimes cause strabismus, presumably because it had been inadvertently injected into a muscle. Initially attributed to simple myotoxic damage, careful observation of the clinical time course showed more complex sequelae, including increased contractility and elevated stiffness. It was later clarified that bupivacaine injection induces modest hypertrophy, which could be harnessed to produce muscle shortening and alignment corrections. Bupivacaine injection is currently an office procedure performed under topical anesthesia in cooperative adults, and has been used as an alternative to strabismus surgery to treat moderate-sized, non-paralytic, non-restrictive strabismus since 2006. Stability of alignment correction has been documented for up to 5 years.

==== Adjuvants ====
The length at which the muscle treated with bupivacaine regenerates is determined by the length at which it is held during regeneration. Injection of small dose of botulinum toxin in the antagonist muscle weakens it for a few weeks, preventing stretching of the bupivacaine-injected muscle, allowing it to regenerate shorter than otherwise, thereby providing about twice the alignment correction of bupivacaine alone. The effectiveness of a bupivacaine injection may be increased by combining it with the vasoconstrictor epinephrine, which lengthens exposure time.

== Surgery ==
Treatment is usually surgical, performed at the insertional ends of extraocular muscles (where they attach to the globe). Resection surgery removes tissue in order to stretch a muscle, increasing its elastic force; recession moves an insertion so as to reduce stretch, and so reduce elastic force; transposition moves an insertion "sideways", sacrificing one direction of muscle action for another; posterior fixation relocates a muscle's effective insertion to a mechanically disadvantageous position. All are kinds of compensatory impairment. Pharmacologic injection treatments, in contrast, offer the possibility of directly increasing or decreasing contractile muscle strength and elastic stiffness, as well as changing muscle length, without removing tissue or otherwise compromising orbital mechanics. The idea of treating strabismus by cutting some of the extraocular muscle fibers was published in American newspapers by New York oculist John Scudder in 1837

Spherical lenses and miotic eye drops can provide relief in some types of horizontal strabismus by biasing the neural link between convergence (orienting the lines of sight for near objects) and accommodation (focusing), and prism lenses can relieve diplopia (double vision) by refracting the visual axis, but these treatments don't address the underlying muscular imbalance, and are not further considered here.

== Drug treatment vs surgery ==
With surgery, results are seen in a few days. After bupivacaine injection the muscle is inactivated by the drug's anesthetic effect for a day, and weakened by myofiber destruction for a week or so, after which regeneration and hypertrophy over 2–3 weeks gradually achieves the corrected alignment. If bupivacaine injection is combined with a small dose of botulinum toxin in the antagonist muscle, eye deviation during regeneration is minimized. Strabismus surgery generally sacrifices one mechanical effect to gain another, and always causes scarring, both of which may make any subsequent procedures more difficult. Bupivacaine injection treatment, in contrast, directly increases muscle strength and reduces length. Strabismus surgery requires an operating room, anesthetist, and other personnel, whereas bupivacaine injection in cooperative adults is an office procedure taking only a few minutes. Bupivacaine injection is not effective in paralyzed or atrophic muscles, or where there are restrictions to movement elsewhere in the orbit (e.g., fibrotic muscles). Very small misalignments might be better treated surgically because of the risk of "overcorrection", which tends to cause diplopia (double vision).

== Orthoptics ==
A complex approach to non-surgical management of strabismus (wandering eye), amblyopia (lazy eye) and eye movement disorders may include a variety of vision therapy methods, primarily directed at the abnormal retinal correspondence management such as eye occlusion with an eye patch, binocular vision training using a haploscope and many others. The orthoptic therapy can be used either before or after the surgical treatment, as it is prescribed by an eye care specialist.
