= Sixth nerve palsy =

Inability to turn out the eye due to dysfunction of the abducens nerve

- Other names: Lateral rectus palsy, VIth cranial nerve palsy, abducens nerve palsy
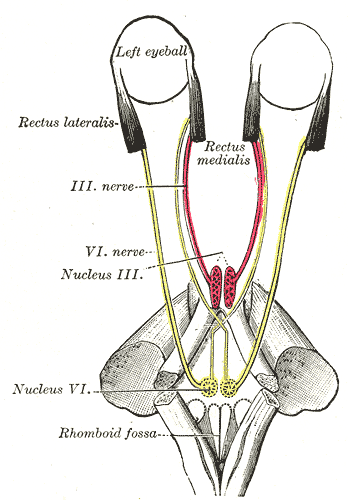
- Figure showing the mode of innervation of the Recti medialis and lateralis of the eye.
- Specialty: Neurology

Sixth nerve palsy, or abducens nerve palsy, is a disorder associated with dysfunction of cranial nerve VI (the abducens nerve), which is responsible for causing contraction of the lateral rectus muscle to abduct (i.e., turn out) the eye. The inability of an eye to turn outward results in a convergent strabismus or esotropia, of which the primary symptom is diplopia (commonly known as double vision), in which the two images appear side-by-side. Thus, the diplopia is horizontal and worse in the distance. Diplopia is also increased when looking at the affected side. It is partly caused by overaction of the medial rectus on the unaffected side as it tries to provide the extra innervation to the affected lateral rectus. These two muscles are synergists or "yoke muscles" as both attempt to move the eye to the left or right. The condition is commonly unilateral but can also occur bilaterally.

The unilateral abducens nerve palsy is the most common isolated ocular motor nerve palsies.

== Signs and symptoms ==
Limitation of abduction of the right eye. This individual tries to look to his right, but the right eye fails to turn to the side.

The nerve dysfunction induces esotropia, a convergent squint on distance fixation. On near fixation, the affected individual may have only a latent deviation and be able to maintain binocularity or have an esotropia of a smaller size. Patients sometimes adopt a face turned towards the side of the affected eye, moving the eye away from the field of action of the affected lateral rectus muscle, to control diplopia and maintain binocular vision.

Adults with VI nerve palsies typically experience Diplopia, but children with the condition may not experience diplopia due to suppression. The neuroplasticity present in childhood allows the child to 'switch off' the information coming from one eye (in this case, the esotropic eye), thus relieving any diplopic symptoms. Whilst this is a positive adaptation in the short term, in the long term it can lead to a lack of appropriate development of the visual cortex, giving rise to permanent visual loss in the suppressed eye; a condition known as amblyopia or Lazy eye.

== Cause ==
Because the nerve emerges near the bottom of the brain, it is often the first nerve compressed when there is any rise in intracranial pressure. Different presentations of the condition, or associations with other conditions, can help localize the lesion's site along the VIth cranial nerve pathway.

The most common causes of VIth nerve palsy in adults are:

- More common: Vasculopathic (diabetes, hypertension, atherosclerosis), trauma, idiopathic.
- Less common: Increased intracranial pressure, giant cell arteritis, cavernous sinus mass (e.g. meningioma, Brain stem Glioblastoma aneurysm, metastasis), multiple sclerosis, sarcoidosis/vasculitis, postmyelography, lumbar puncture, stroke (usually not isolated), Chiari Malformation, hydrocephalus, intracranial hypertension, tuberculosis meningitis.

In children, Harley reports typical causes as traumatic, neoplastic (most commonly brainstem glioma), as well as idiopathic. Sixth nerve palsy causes the eyes to deviate inward (see: Pathophysiology of strabismus). Vallee et al. report that benign and rapidly recovering isolated VIth nerve palsy can occur in childhood, sometimes precipitated by ear, nose and throat infections.

== Pathophysiology ==
The pathophysiological mechanism of sixth nerve palsy with increased intracranial pressure has traditionally been said to be stretching the nerve in its long intracranial course, or compression against the petrous ligament or the ridge of the petrous temporal bone. Collier, however, was "unable to accept this explanation", his view being that since the sixth nerve emerges straight forward from the brain stem, whereas other cranial nerves emerge obliquely or transversely, it is more liable to the mechanical effects of backwards brain stem displacement by intracranial space-occupying lesions.

=== Brainstem ===
Isolated lesions of the VI nerve nucleus will not give rise to an isolated VIth nerve palsy because paramedian pontine reticular formation fibers pass through the nucleus to the opposite IIIrd nerve nucleus. Thus, a nuclear lesion will give rise to an ipsilateral gaze palsy. In addition, fibers of the seventh cranial nerve wrap around the VIth nerve nucleus, and, if this is also affected, a VIth nerve palsy with ipsilateral facial palsy will result. In Millard–Gubler syndrome, a unilateral softening of the brain tissue arising from obstruction of the blood vessels of the pons involving the sixth and seventh cranial nerves and the corticospinal tract, the VIth nerve palsy and ipsilateral facial paresis occur with a contralateral hemiparesis. Foville's syndrome can also arise due to brainstem lesions affecting the Vth, VIth, and VIIth cranial nerves.

=== Subarachnoid space ===
As the VIth nerve passes through the subarachnoid space, it lies adjacent to the anterior inferior and posterior inferior cerebellar and basilar arteries and is therefore vulnerable to compression against the clivus. Typically, palsies caused in this way will be associated with signs and symptoms of headache and/or a rise in ICP.

=== Petrous apex ===
The nerve passes adjacent to the mastoid sinus and is vulnerable to mastoiditis, leading to meninges inflammation, which can give rise to Gradenigo's syndrome. This condition results in a VIth nerve palsy with an associated reduction in hearing ipsilaterally, plus facial pain, paralysis, and photophobia. Similar symptoms can also occur secondary to petrous fractures or to nasopharyngeal tumours.

=== Cavernous sinus/Superior orbital fissure ===
The nerve runs in the sinus body adjacent to the internal carotid artery and oculo-sympathetic fibres responsible for pupil control; thus, lesions here might be associated with pupillary dysfunctions such as Horner's syndrome. In addition, III, IV, V1, and V2 involvement might indicate a sinus lesion as all run toward the orbit in the sinus wall. Lesions in this area can arise due to vascular problems, inflammation, metastatic carcinomas and primary meningiomas.

=== Orbit ===
The VIth nerve's course is short, and lesions in the orbit rarely give rise to isolated VIth nerve palsies; rather, they typically involve one or more of the other extraocular muscle groups.

== Diagnosis ==
=== Differential diagnoses ===
Differential diagnosis is rarely difficult in adults. Onset is typically sudden with symptoms of horizontal diplopia. Limitations of eye movements are confined to abduction of the affected eye (or abduction of both eyes if bilateral). And the size of the resulting convergent squint or esotropia is always larger on distance fixation - where the lateral recti are more active - than on near fixation - where the medial recti are dominant. Abduction limitations that mimic VIth nerve palsy may result secondary to surgery, trauma or as a result of other conditions such as myasthenia gravis or thyroid eye disease.

Differential diagnosis is more difficult in children because of the problems inherent in getting infants to cooperate with a full eye movement investigation. Possible alternative diagnosis for an abduction deficit would include:

1. Mobius syndrome - a rare congenital disorder in which both VIth and VIIth nerves are bilaterally affected, giving rise to a typically 'expressionless' face.

2. Duane syndrome - A condition in which both abduction and adduction are affected, arising as a result of partial innervation of the lateral rectus by branches from the IIIrd oculomotor cranial nerve.

3. Cross fixation develops in the presence of infantile esotropia or nystagmus blockage syndrome and results in habitual weakness of the lateral recti.

4. Iatrogenic injury. Abducens nerve palsy is also known to occur with halo orthosis placement. The resultant palsy is identified through loss of lateral gaze after application of the orthosis and is the most common cranial nerve injury associated with this device.

== Management ==
The first aims of management should be to identify and treat the condition's cause, where possible, and to relieve the patient's symptoms, where present. In children, who rarely appreciate diplopia, the aim will be to maintain binocular vision and, thus, promote proper visual development.

Thereafter, a period of observation of around 6 months is appropriate before any further intervention, as some palsies will recover without surgery.

=== Symptom relief and/or binocular vision maintenance ===
This is most commonly achieved through the use of Fresnel prisms. These slim, flexible plastic prisms can be attached to the patient's glasses or to plano glasses if the patient has no refractive error and serve to compensate for the inward misalignment of the affected eye. Unfortunately, the prism only corrects for a fixed degree of misalignment, and because the affected individual's degree of misalignment will vary depending upon their direction of gaze, they may still experience diplopia when looking to the affected side. The prisms are available in different strengths, and the most appropriate can be selected for each patient. However, in patients with large deviations, the thickness of the prism required may reduce vision so much that binocularity is not achievable. In such cases, it may be more appropriate to occlude one eye temporarily. Occlusion would never be used in infants, though, because of the risk of inducing stimulus deprivation amblyopia and because they do not experience diplopia.

Other management options at this initial stage include using botulinum toxin, which is injected into the ipsilateral medial rectus (botulinum toxin therapy of strabismus). The use of BT serves several purposes. Firstly, it helps to prevent the contracture of the medial rectus, which might result from its acting unopposed for a long period. Secondly, by reducing the size of the deviation temporarily, it might allow prismatic correction to be used where this was not previously possible, and, thirdly, by removing the pull of the medial rectus, it may serve to reveal whether the palsy is partial or complete by allowing any residual movement capability of the lateral rectus to operate. Thus, the toxin works therapeutically by helping to reduce symptoms and enhancing the prospects for fuller ocular movements post-operatively, and diagnostically, by helping to determine the type of operation most appropriate for each patient.

A Cochrane Review on interventions for eye movement disorders due to acquired brain injury, last updated June 2017, identified one study of botulinum toxin for acute sixth nerve palsy. The Cochrane review authors judged this to be low-certainty evidence; the study was not masked, and the effect estimate was imprecise.

=== Longer term management ===
If adequate recovery has not occurred after the 6-month period (during which observation, prism management, occlusion, or botulinum toxin may be considered), surgical treatment is often recommended.

If the residual esotropia is small, or if the patient is unfit or unwilling to have surgery, prisms can be incorporated into their glasses to provide more permanent symptom relief. When the deviation is too large for prismatic correction to be effective, permanent occlusion may be the only option for those unfit or unwilling to have surgery.

=== Surgery ===
The procedure chosen will depend upon the degree to which any function remains in the affected lateral rectus. Where there is complete paralysis, the preferred option is to perform vertical muscle transposition procedures such as Jensen's, Hummelheim's or whole muscle transposition, to use the functioning inferior and superior recti to gain some degree of abduction. An alternative approach is to operate on both the affected eye's lateral and medial recti, stabilising it at the midline, thus giving single vision straight ahead but potentially diplopia on both far left and right gaze. This procedure is often most appropriate for those with total paralysis who, because of other health problems, are at increased risk of the anterior segment ischaemia associated with complex multi-muscle transposition procedures.

Where some function remains in the affected eye, the preferred procedure depends upon the degree of development of muscle sequelae. In a sixth nerve palsy one would expect that, over the 6 month observation period, most patients would show the following pattern of changes to their ocular muscle actions: firstly, an overaction of the medial rectus of the affected eye, then an overaction of the medial rectus of the contraletral eye and, finally, an underaction of the lateral rectus of the unaffected eye - something known as an inhibitional palsy. These changes reduce the variation in the misalignment of the two eyes in different gaze positions (incomitance). Where this process has fully developed, the preferred option is a simple recession, or weakening, of the medial rectus of the affected eye, combined with a resection, or strengthening, of the lateral rectus of the same eye. However, where the inhibitional palsy of the contralateral lateral rectus has not developed, there will still be gross incomitance, with the disparity between the eye positions being markedly greater in the field of action of the affected muscle. In such cases, recession of the medial rectus of the affected eye is accompanied by recession and/or posterior fixation (Fadenoperation) of the contraleral medial rectus.

The same approaches are adopted bilaterally, where both eyes are affected.

== See also ==
- Congenital fourth nerve palsy
