= Botulinum toxin therapy of strabismus =

Medical technique

- Specialty: Ophthalmologist

Botulinum toxin therapy of strabismus is a medical technique used sometimes in the management of strabismus, in which botulinum toxin is injected into selected extraocular muscles in order to reduce the misalignment of the eyes. The injection of the toxin to treat strabismus, reported upon in 1981, is considered to be the first ever use of botulinum toxin for therapeutic purposes. Today, the injection of botulinum toxin into the muscles that surround the eyes is one of the available options in the management of strabismus. Other options for strabismus management are vision therapy and occlusion therapy, corrective glasses (or contact lenses) and prism glasses, and strabismus surgery.

The effects that are due only to the toxin itself (including the side effects) generally wear off within 3 to 4 months. In contrast, improvements in alignment may be long-lasting, particularly in two circumstances. First, if the "antagonist" muscle (the muscle pulling in the opposite direction) is active, the injected muscle will be stretched, and may permanently lengthen by adding tissue during the period of toxin paresis. Second, if binocular vision has been achieved and stabilized, alignment may "lock in". There are indications that botulinum toxin therapy is as successful as strabismus surgery for patients with binocular vision and that it is less successful than surgery for those who have no binocular vision.

== Principle ==
Botulinum toxin is the most acutely lethal toxin that is known. It is produced by the bacterium clostridium botulinum. It acts inside nerve terminals by decreasing the release of acetylcholine, blocking neuromuscular transmission and thereby causing flaccid muscular paralysis. As a result, the muscle is weakened for about 3 to 4 months.

For treating strabismus, the toxin is used in much diluted form, and the injection is targeted to reach specific muscles that move the eye, thereby temporarily weakening the selected muscles.

== Technique ==
=== Injection ===
After local or general anaesthesia has been applied, the botulinum toxin is injected directly into the selected eye muscles using a specially designed needle electrode that is connected to an electromyography (EMG) apparatus as well as to a syringe containing the botulinum toxin solution.

When under local anaesthesia, the patient is asked to move the eyes just before the toxin is injected. This results in an EMG signal which provides instant feedback on the correct placement of the needle. If the patient is a young child, general anaesthesia is always used.

The duration of the intervention is one to two minutes if the person performing the procedure has sufficient experience.

=== Dosage ===
The dosage to be used cannot be determined with precision, as no reliable relation between dose and effect could be established so far. The toxicity of botulinum toxin varies from one lot to the next; furthermore, the body may show an immunoreaction by which the efficacy of subsequent treatments is reduced.

== Clinical use ==
Botulinum toxin is considered as an alternative to surgery in certain clinical situations. A study performed in the 1980s found outcomes of surgery to be "more predictable and longer lasting" than those of botulinum toxin therapy. As stated in a review article of 2007, its use for strabismus "varies enormously in different cities and countries for no apparent reason."

In a small-scale study, adults whose reading difficulties due to convergence insufficiency had been unsuccessfully addressed by convergence exercises, base-in prism glasses or strabismus surgery showed improved reading after botulinum toxin therapy, maintaining improved reading remaining also after six months.

=== Use as primary therapy ===
Botulinum toxin is considered a useful alternative to surgery in particular cases, for example for persons unfit for general anaesthesia, in evolving or unstable clinical conditions, after unsuccessful surgery, or to provide short-term relief from diplopia.

For patients who have had healthy vision heretofore until a small, horizontal deviation set in suddenly, the injection of botulinum toxin may allow them to maintain the binocular vision skills that had been acquired earlier.

Some consider botulinum injections to be a treatment option for children with small- to moderate-angle infantile esotropia. Studies have provided indications that performing injections into both medial rectus muscles may be more effective than an injection into one medial rectus muscle alone.

Botulinum toxin therapy has been reported to be similarly successful as strabismus surgery for patients with binocular vision and less successful than surgery for those who have no binocular vision. One study found that botulinum toxin therapy had similar long-term success rates for treating infantile esotropia with botulinum toxin A before the age of 12 months as would have been expected from strabismus surgery. Another study reported similar long-term success rates for infantile esotropia treated before 24 months of age by either strabismus surgery or botulinum toxin treatment.

=== Intra- and postoperational use ===
Botulinum toxin has also been used postoperatively for improving the alignment in patients with over- or undercorrection after strabismus surgery, leading to rapid elimination of postoperative diplopia but possibly requiring repeated injections or reoperation later on. It is considered particularly useful for patients who have the potential for binocular vision; success rates are higher for treating postoperative esotropia than for treating postoperative exotropia.

It has also been employed in combination with strabismus surgery in cases in which there is a large horizontal eye deviation and eye muscle surgery on both eyes (binocular surgery) is not an option for other reasons.

== Side effects ==
The most common side effects are droopy eyelids (ptosis) and over- or undercorrections; further common side effects are diplopia and inadvertent vertical deviation (hypo- or hypertropia). The side effects typically resolve in 3–4 months. Vision-threatening complications are rare, and the intervention is generally considered safe, also when performed repeatedly.

== Bupivacaine ==
It is also under investigation whether the injection of bupivacaine into extraocular muscles is of possible therapeutic use for treating some forms of strabismus, be it alone or in combination with botulinum toxin.

Bupivacaine is a local anaesthetic known to cause considerable myotoxicity and neurotoxicity. Its injection into muscle tissue leads to a dramatic degeneration of muscle fibres accompanied by a moderate inflammatory response. It subsequently leads to a thickening and strengthening of the muscle. The thickening of bupivacaine-injected extraocular muscle has been demonstrated by means of magnetic resonance imaging and by means of ultrasonography. Bupivacaine injection is therefore being investigated as a further possibility in the treatment of strabismus. In some interventions bupivacaine has been used alone. In others, a botulinum toxin injection into an extraocular muscle is accompanied by a bupivacaine injection into the antagonist muscle.

== History ==
Alan B. Scott first injected botulinum toxin into extraocular muscles in the early 1970s and published his results in 1981, giving rise to a wide scope of clinical research on the use of the toxin.

The effect of bupivaine injection on extraocular muscles was first known as causing postsurgical strabismus as a complication of cataract surgery due to the myotoxicity of the local anaesthetic drug bupivaine when inadvertently injected into an extraocular muscle.
