= Minimally invasive strabismus surgery =

Minimally invasive strabismus surgery (MISS) is a technique in strabismus surgery that uses smaller incisions than the classical surgical approach to correct the condition, thus minimizing tissue disruption. The technique was introduced by Swiss ophthalmologist Daniel Mojon around 2007, after the Belgian ophthalmologist Marc Gobin described the idea in 1994 in a French-language textbook.

== Indications ==
MISS is a technique that can be employed for all major types of strabismus surgery like rectus muscle recessions, resections, plications, reoperations, transpositions, oblique muscle recessions, or plications, and adjustable sutures, even in the presence of restricted motility. The smaller openings and the less traumatic procedure are in general associated with faster postoperative rehabilitation and less swelling and discomfort for the patient immediately after the procedure. It is supposed that the technique can be performed as an outpatient intervention in many patients (mainly adults) who would otherwise be hospitalized. A study published in 2017 documented fewer conjunctival and eyelid swelling complications in the immediate postoperative period after MISS than after conventional strabismus surgery with long-term results being similar between both groups. Another advantage is that MISS technique may decrease the risk of anterior segment ischemia in some patients, particularly those suffering from Graves' ophthalmopathy.

== Principle ==
In MISS the operating microscope rather than magnifying glasses should be used by the surgeon. Instead of one large opening of the conjunctiva as is done in conventional strabismus surgery, several small cuts are placed where the main surgical steps, usually suturing, have to be performed. Openings are placed as far away from the corneal limbus as possible to minimize postoperative discomfort. Between two of these incisions, called keyhole openings, there is a "tunnel" used by the surgeon to insert the instrument for the treatment of the eye muscles. At the end of the operation, the keyhole openings are closed with resorbable sutures. These mini-incisions are postoperatively covered by the eyelid. MISS openings markedly reduce the frequency and severity of corneal complications like, for example, dry eye syndrome and dellen formation, and will allow wearing contact lenses earlier. Long-term benefits are avoidance of an increase in redness of the visible conjunctiva and a decreased scarring of the perimuscular tissue, which will facilitate reoperations - if those should become necessary.

== Clinical results ==
The results after MISS regarding postoperative ocular alignment are widely described in the so far still limited literature on the technique to be about the same as in classical strabismus surgery. This was documented, for instance, in comparing 40 children; the group that had undergone the minimally invasive procedure, however, did show less swelling of the conjunctiva and the eyelids after surgery. Lesser rates of complications and faster reconvalescence have been widely established as the main advantages of MISS. The technique's efficacy has been shown for surgery of the rectus muscles as well as for the surgery of the oblique muscles. A group from India reported on the successful performance of MISS in patients with Graves' orbitopathy.

A systematic review of 2025 concluded that MISS is a safe and effective alternative to traditional strabismus surgery and offers the advantages of shorter operative time and reduced postoperative scarring, but that further high-quality randomized controlled trials are needed to confirm these findings and to assess the long-term outcomes of MISS.

== Disadvantages and potential complications ==
MISS is more time-consuming than conventional surgery. Operating on the muscles through the tunnel is more demanding on the surgeon. The keyhole cuts may tear in older patients. If the tear involves Tenon's capsule, a visible scar may result. An excessive bleeding that cannot be stopped makes an enlargement of the cuts necessary to cauterize the vessel. Usually, a conversion to a limbal opening as in classical strabismus surgery can be avoided. There are few reports, though, on complications that are unique to MISS.
