= William J. Binder =

American facial plastic and reconstructive surgeon

- Occupations: Facial plastic and reconstructive surgeon
- Known for: Use of Botox as chronic migraine cure
- Website: doctorbinder.com

William J. Binder is an American facial plastic surgeon. He is best known for his 1992 discovery of the use of Botox to alleviate chronic migraine.

== Biography ==
Binder holds an M.D. degree from the University of Medicine and Dentistry of New Jersey. He was elected as a member of the Board of Directors of the American Academy of Facial Plastic and Reconstructive Surgery, where he also serves as a National Board Examiner.

He is a member of the National Review Committee for the American Academy of Neurology Therapeutics and Technologies Subcommittee on the Assessment of Botulinum Toxin Therapy and also is an adjunct reviewer for the Archives of Facial Plastic Surgery Journal.

Binder is board certified by both the American Academy of Facial Plastic and Reconstructive Surgery and the American Board of Otolaryngology and Head and Neck Surgery. He has published around 70 articles in national medical and surgical journals. He has edited three textbooks in Facial Plastic Surgery, Head and Neck Surgery, and Otolaryngology.

He speaks and lectures on various aspects of facial plastic surgery including rhinoplasty and a multi-level concept of facelift surgery.

Binder has filed 15 U.S. and European patents in the area of Custom Plastic Surgery Implants, Method for Reduction of Migraine Headache Pain, Flexible support wrap, and Anesthesia conduit.

In 1992, Binder discovered the use of Botox to alleviate the suffering of those with chronic migraine headaches. He reported that patients who had cosmetic injections around the face reported relief from chronic headache. This was initially thought to be an indirect effect of reduced muscle tension, but it is now known that the toxin inhibits release of peripheral nociceptive neurotransmitters, suppressing the central pain processing systems responsible for migraine headache. In 2010, the FDA approved intramuscular botulinum toxin injections for prophylactic treatment of chronic migraine headache.
