= Daniel Mojon =

Swiss ophthalmologist and ophthalmic surgeon

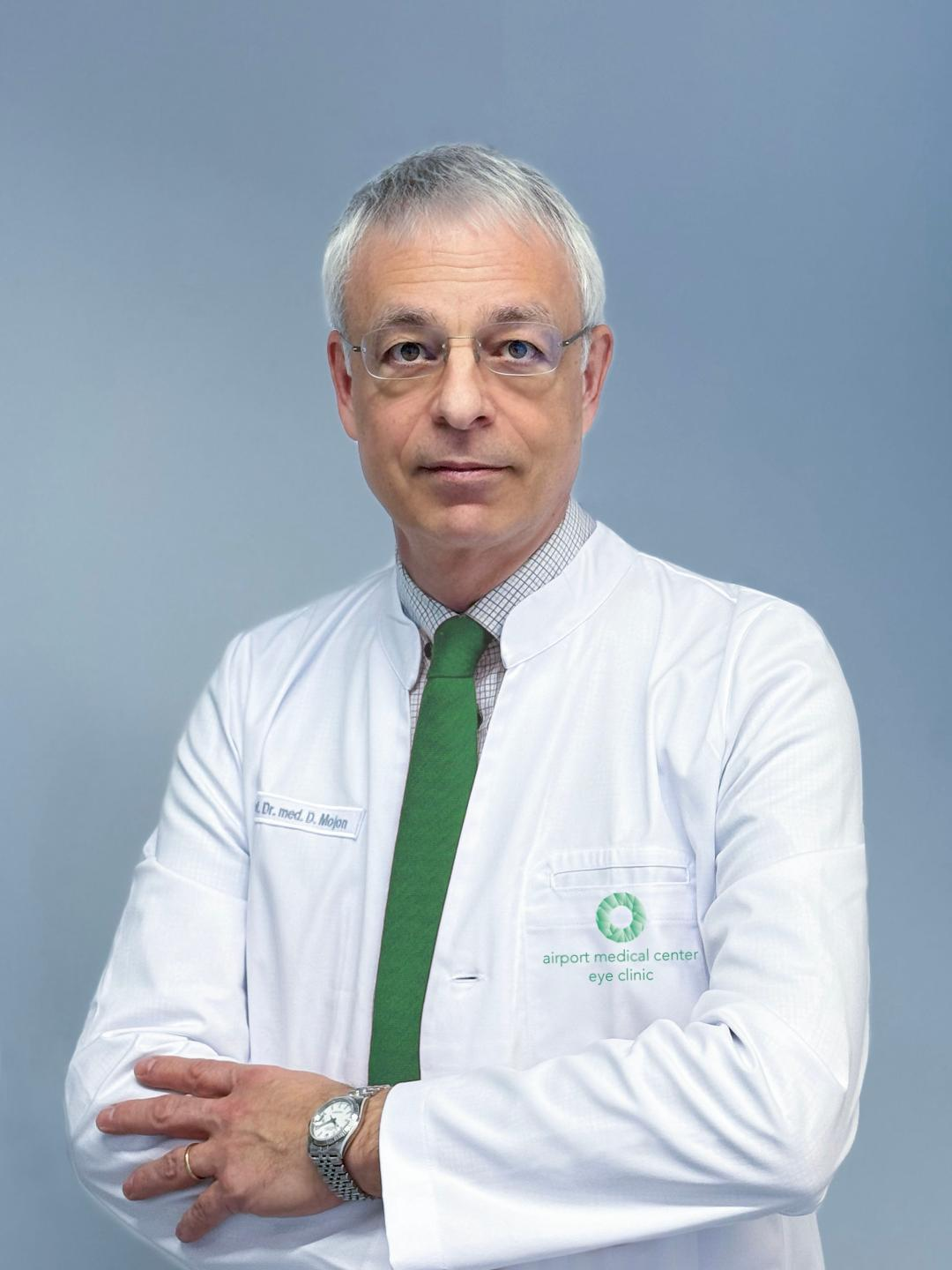
Daniel Mojon

Daniel Mojon (born July 29, 1963, in Bern, Switzerland) is a Swiss ophthalmologist, who is considered to be the inventor of Minimally Invasive Strabismus Surgery (MISS).

== Career ==
The son of art historian Luc Mojon, Daniel Mojon studied Medicine at the University of Bern and at Columbia University in New York, USA. He has held senior positions at the University Eye Clinic in Bern and the Department of Ophthalmology at the Cantonal Hospital of St. Gallen. At the University Hospital of Bern (Inselspital), he was Chief Physician of the Department of Strabismology and Neuroophthalmology, as well as Head of the Glaucoma Outpatient Clinic. At the Ophthalmology Clinic of the Cantonal Hospital of St. Gallen, he headed the laboratories for Experimental Oculography. He earned his postdoctoral lecturing qualification at the University Eye Clinic in Bern in 2000. Since then he has taught at the University of Bern, where he became an honorary professor in 2007; Mojon is also a consultant at the Eye Clinic of the Johannes Kepler University Linz. In 2012, he resigned from his position at the Cantonal Hospital of St. Gallen to devote himself to private research and practice. Mojon is married to the health economist Stefania Mojon-Azzi.

== Scientific works ==
The psychosocial aspects of strabismus are a central focus of his scientific research. In several studies, Mojon has demonstrated the extent to which patients with strabismus are disadvantaged and stigmatized in everyday life. Specialized in treating strabismus since the 1990s, Mojon has also developed minimally invasive strabismus surgery (MISS), in which the conjunctiva is opened through very small incisions of only two to a maximum of three millimetres, in contrast to the conventional Harms’ limbal opening technique or the fornix technique developed by Parks. Ten years after its introduction, the safety of this method and the faster rehabilitation after such an operation are widely recognised; however, it is more difficult for the surgeon to learn and perform than the conventional strabismus surgery, which usually involves incisions of over a centimetre.

Mojon introduced other minimally invasive surgical techniques to eye surgery: the so-called VIP technique (viscoelastic and irrigation pressurised technique) for cataract surgery and deep sclerokeratodissection for the surgical treatment of glaucoma. Glaucoma is another focus of Mojon's research. With his research group, he has shown, among other things, the close link between the sleep apnoea syndrome and this common eye disease.

In 2016, Mojon founded the Swiss Academy of Ophthalmology together with several Swiss ophthalmologists (including Dietmar Thumm, Albert Franceschetti and Carl Herbort). The aim of the Foundation is to actively promote quality assurance, research and continuing education in practical ophthalmology. In September 2018, Mojon was the first Swiss ophthalmologist to give a keynote lecture at a DOG (German Ophthalmological Society) conference on the topic of minimally invasive eye surgery. For his innovative contributions to the field of surgical ophthalmology, and in particular for the invention of MISS, in April 2019, Mojon was honored with an honorary lecture at the University of Toronto’s Jack Crawford Day. In November 2020, the American Academy of Ophthalmology (AAO) honored him as an ‘Unsung Hero’, an innovator in modern eye surgery who has yet to be fully recognised. Mojon is the promoter of an international congress for cataract surgeons, which was held for the first time in Zurich in October 2023.

== Writings (selection) ==
- Gerste Ronald D (2019): “Daniel Mojon – Pionier der Minimally Invasive Strabismus Surgery (MISS), Schielen ist auch ein Stigma”, in: Schweizerische Ärztezeitung, 100(9), pp. 317-8.
- Mojon Daniel, Fine Howard (Eds.): “Minimally Invasive Ophthalmic Surgery”, Springer, Berlin, 2010, ISBN 978-3-642-02601-0.
- Mojon DS (2016): “Früherkennung und Behandlung des Strabismus”, in: Therapeutische Umschau, 73, pp. 67-73.
- Mojon-Azzi SM, Mojon DS (2007): “Opinion of Headhunters about the Ability of Strabismic Subjects to obtain Employment”, in: Ophthalmologica, 221, pp. 430-3.
- Mojon-Azzi SM, Kunz A, Mojon DS (2011): “Strabismus and Discrimination in Children: are Children with Strabismus invited to Fewer Birthday Parties?” in: Br J Ophthalmol. 95, pp. 473-6.
- Kaup M, Mojon-Azzi SM, Kunz A, Mojon DS (2011): “Intraoperative Conversion Rate to a Large, Limbal Opening in Minimally Invasive Strabismus Surgery (MISS)”, in: Graefe’s Arch Clin Exp Ophthalmol. 249, pp. 1553-7.
- Mojon DS (2007): “Comparison of a New, Minimally Invasive Strabismus Surgery Technique with the Usual Limbal Approach for Rectus Muscle Recession and Plication”, in: Br J Ophthalmol. 91, pp. 76-82.
- Mojon DS (2008): “Minimally Invasive Strabismus Surgery for Horizontal Rectus Muscle Reoperations”, in: Br J Ophthalmol. 92, pp. 1648-1652.
- Mojon DS (2015): “Minimally Invasive Strabismus Surgery”, in: Eye (Lond). 29, pp. 225-233. doi:10.1038/eye.2014.281. Epub 2014 Nov 28.
