= Botulinum toxin =

Neurotoxin produced by Clostridium botulinum

Botulinum neurotoxin A
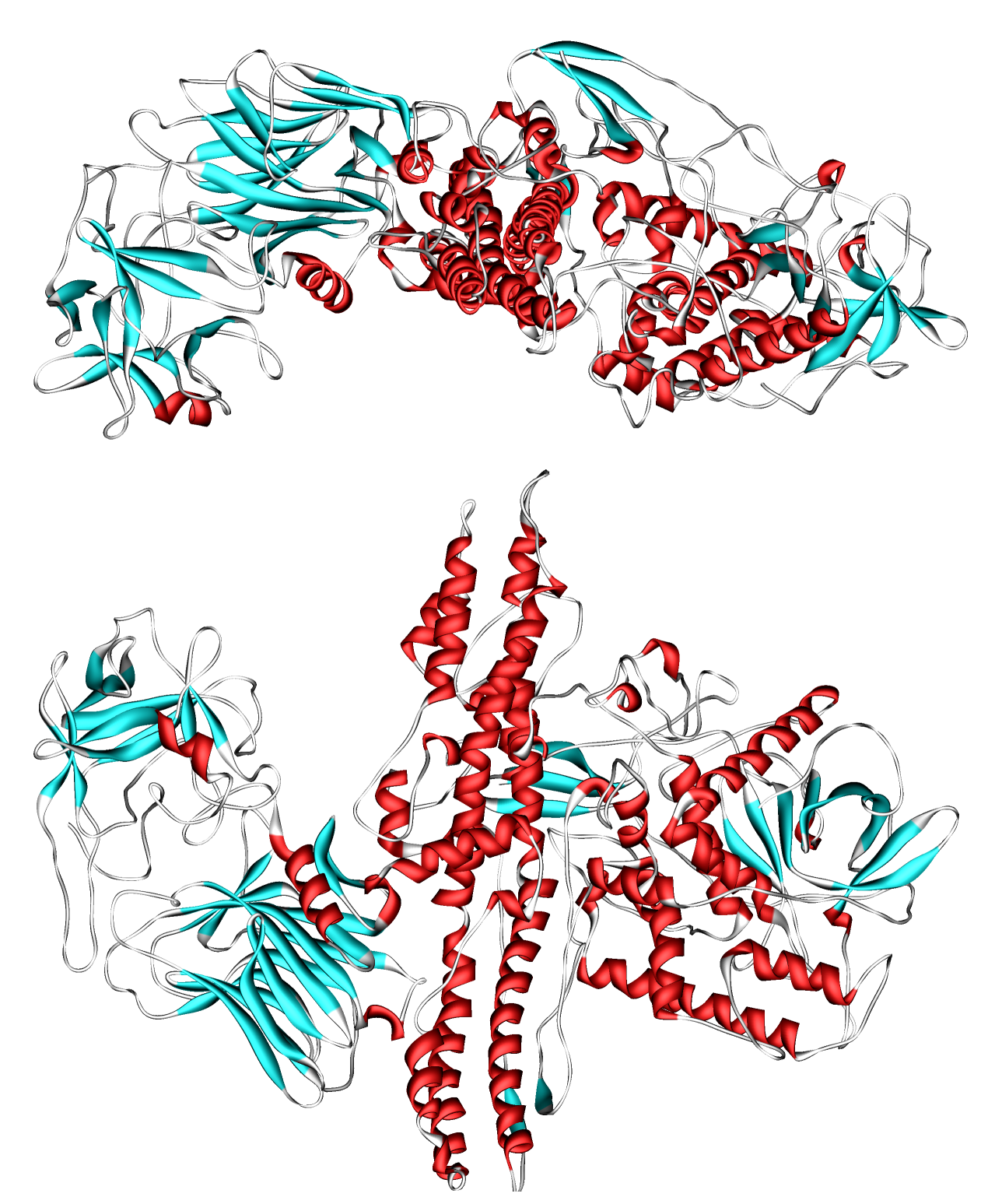
- Ribbon diagram of tertiary structure of BotA (P0DPI1). PDB entry 3BTA.

Clinical data
- Trade names: Botox, others
- Other names: BoNT, botox
- Biosimilars: abobotulinumtoxinA, daxibotulinumtoxinA, daxibotulinumtoxinA-lanm, evabotulinumtoxinA, incobotulinumtoxinA, letibotulinumtoxinA, letibotulinumtoxinA-wlbg, onabotulinumtoxinA, prabotulinumtoxinA, relabotulinumtoxinA, rimabotulinumtoxinB
- AHFS/Drugs.com: abobotulinumtoxinA Monograph; daxibotulinumtoxinA Monograph; incobotulinumtoxinA Monograph; onabotulinumtoxinA Monograph; prabotulinumtoxinA Monograph; rimabotulinumtoxinB Monograph
- MedlinePlus: a619021
- License data: US DailyMed: Botulinum toxin
- Pregnancy category: AU: B3
- Routes of administration: Intramuscular, subcutaneous, intradermal
- ATC code: Botulinum toxin A: M03AX01 (WHO)

Legal status
- Legal status: AU: S4 (Prescription only); CA: ℞-only / Schedule D; UK: POM (Prescription only); US: ℞-only; EU: Rx-only

Identifiers
- CAS Number: Botulinum toxin A: 93384-43-1; Botulinum toxin B: 93384-43-2
- DrugBank: Botulinum toxin A: DB00083; Botulinum toxin B: DB00042
- ChemSpider: Botulinum toxin A: none
- UNII: Botulinum toxin A: E211KPY694; Botulinum toxin B: 0Y70779M1F
- KEGG: Botulinum toxin A: D00783; Botulinum toxin B: D08957

Chemical and physical data
- Formula: C_{6760}H_{10447}N_{1743}O_{2010}S_{32}
- Molar mass: 149323.05 g·mol^{−1}

Bontoxilysin

Identifiers
- EC no.: 3.4.24.69

Databases
- BRENDA: enzyme data
- ExPASy: NiceZyme view
- KEGG: enzyme entry
- MetaCyc: metabolic pathway
- Rhea: reactions
- PDB structures: RCSB PDB PDBe PDBsum
- Gene Ontology: AmiGO / QuickGO
Search
- PMC: articles
- PubMed: articles
- NCBI: proteins

Botulinum toxin, botulinum neurotoxin, or botox is a neurotoxic protein produced by the bacterium Clostridium botulinum and related species, and it is considered the deadliest known substance produced naturally in recorded chemical literature. It prevents the release of the neurotransmitter acetylcholine from axon endings at the neuromuscular junction, thus causing flaccid paralysis. The toxin causes the disease botulism. Botulinum toxin is an acetylcholine release inhibitor and a neuromuscular blocking agent. Botulinum toxin was developed as a biological agent by the Soviet, United States, and Iraqi biological weapons programs. In strongly diluted form, the toxin is also used for medical and cosmetic purposes.

The seven main types of botulinum toxin are named types A to G (A, B, C1, C2, D, E, F and G). New types are occasionally found. Types A and B are capable of causing disease in humans, and are also used commercially and medically. Types C–G are less common.

In 2025, the structure of the complete 14 subunit botulinum neurotoxin complex (L-PTC) was solved.

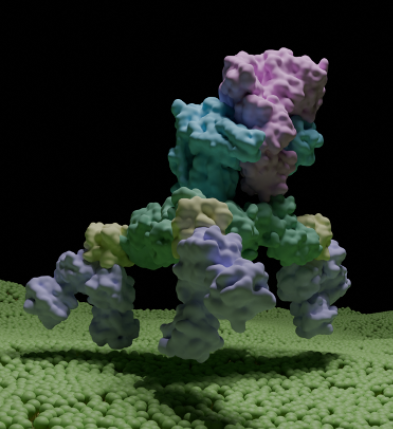
The toxin complex (L-PTC) with its 14 components. The toxin itself is colored pink and sits at the top of the complex. The structure consists of tens of thousands of atoms, and here only the surface of the complex is shown.

Intoxication can occur naturally as a result of either wound or intestinal infection or by ingesting formed toxin in food. The estimated human median lethal dose of type A toxin is 1.3–2.1 ng/kg intravenously or intramuscularly, 10–13 ng/kg when inhaled, or 1 μg/kg when taken by mouth.

== Medical uses ==
Botulinum toxin is used to treat a number of therapeutic indications, many of which are not part of the approved drug label.

=== Muscle spasticity ===
Botulinum toxin is used to treat a number of disorders characterized by overactive muscle movement, including cerebral palsy, post-stroke spasticity, post-spinal cord injury spasticity, spasms of the head and neck, eyelid, vagina, limbs, jaw, and vocal cords. Similarly, botulinum toxin is used to relax the clenching of muscles, including those of the esophagus, jaw, lower urinary tract and bladder, or clenching of the anus which can exacerbate anal fissure. Botulinum toxin appears to be effective for refractory overactive bladder.

=== Other muscle disorders ===
Strabismus, otherwise known as improper eye alignment, is caused by imbalances in the actions of muscles that rotate the eyes. This condition can sometimes be relieved by weakening a muscle that pulls too strongly, or pulls against one that has been weakened by disease or trauma. Muscles weakened by toxin injection recover from paralysis after several months, so injection might seem to need to be repeated, but muscles adapt to the lengths at which they are chronically held, so that if a paralyzed muscle is stretched by its antagonist, it grows longer, while the antagonist shortens, yielding a permanent effect.

In January 2014, botulinum toxin was approved by UK's Medicines and Healthcare products Regulatory Agency for treatment of restricted ankle motion due to lower-limb spasticity associated with stroke in adults.

In July 2016, the US Food and Drug Administration (FDA) approved abobotulinumtoxinA (Dysport) for injection for the treatment of lower-limb spasticity in pediatric patients two years of age and older. AbobotulinumtoxinA is the first and only FDA-approved botulinum toxin for the treatment of pediatric lower limb spasticity. In the US, the FDA approves the text of the labels of prescription medicines and for which medical conditions the drug manufacturer may sell the drug. However, prescribers may freely prescribe them for any condition they wish, also known as off-label use. Botulinum toxins have been used off-label for several pediatric conditions, including infantile esotropia.

=== Excessive sweating ===
Botulinum toxin (BTO) injections are a modern clinical trend to treat hyperhidrosis, of which palmar hyperhidrosis is a frequent symptom. For example, AbobotulinumtoxinA has been approved for the treatment of axillary hyperhidrosis, which cannot be managed by topical agents.

=== Migraine ===
In 2010, the FDA approved intramuscular botulinum toxin injections for prophylactic treatment of chronic migraine headache. However, the use of botulinum toxin injections for episodic migraine has not been approved by the FDA.

=== Cosmetic uses ===
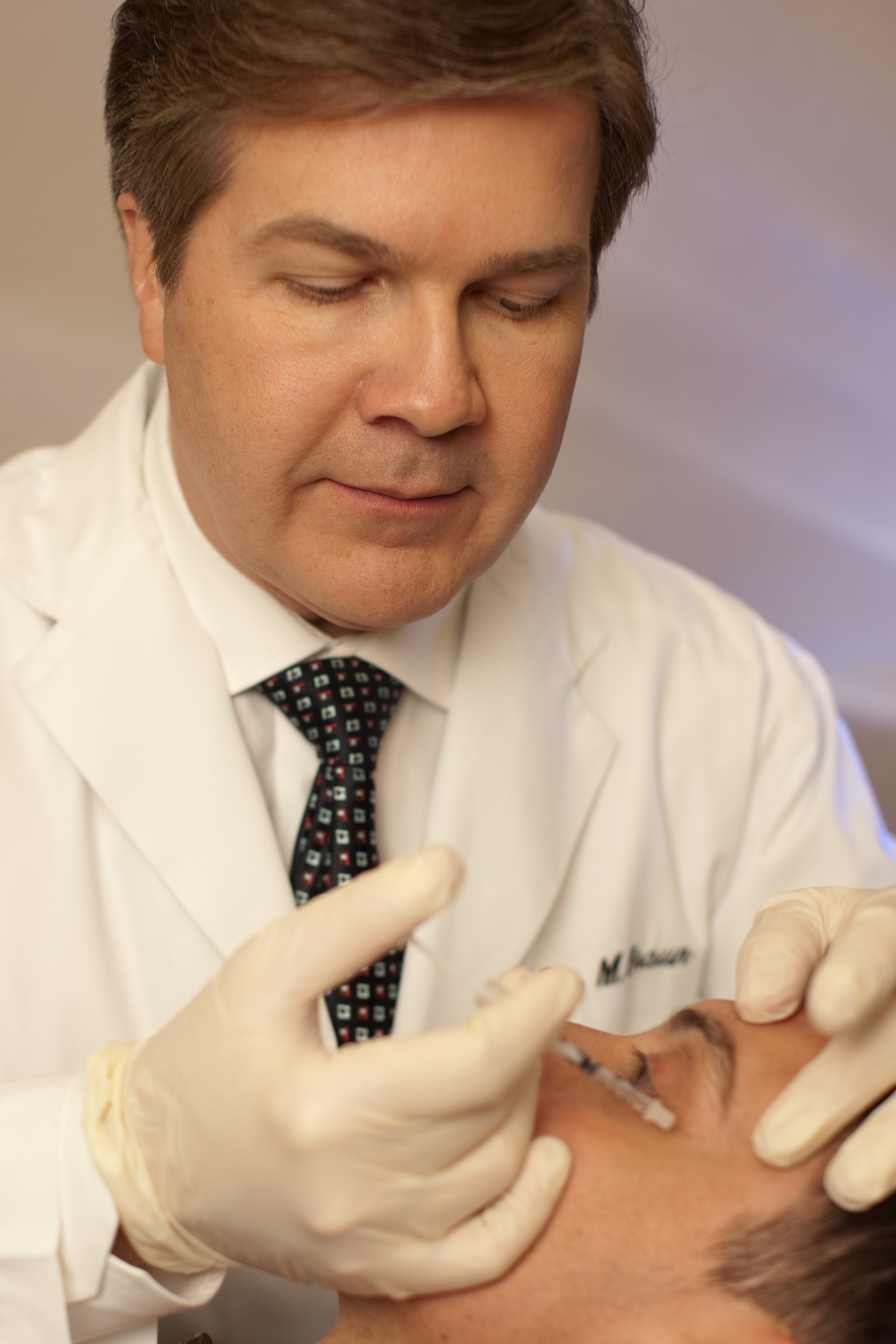
Botulinum toxin being injected in the human face

In cosmetic applications, botulinum toxin is considered relatively safe and effective for reduction of facial wrinkles, especially in the uppermost third of the face. Commercial forms are marketed under the brand names Botox Cosmetic/Vistabel from Allergan, Dysport/Azzalure from Galderma and Ipsen, Xeomin/Bocouture from Merz, Jeuveau/Nuceiva from Evolus, manufactured by Daewoong in South Korea. The effects of botulinum toxin injections for glabellar lines ("11's lines" between the eyes) typically last two to four months and in some cases, product-dependent, with some patients experiencing a longer duration of effect of up to six months or longer. Injection of botulinum toxin into the muscles under facial wrinkles causes relaxation of those muscles, resulting in the smoothing of the overlying skin. Smoothing of wrinkles is usually visible three to five days after injection, with maximum effect typically a week following injection. Muscles can be treated repeatedly to maintain the smoothed appearance.

DaxibotulinumtoxinA (Daxxify) was approved for medical use in the United States in September 2022. It is indicated for the temporary improvement in the appearance of moderate to severe glabellar lines. DaxibotulinumtoxinA is an acetylcholine release inhibitor and neuromuscular blocking agent. The FDA approved daxibotulinumtoxinA based on evidence from two clinical trials (Studies GL-1 and GL-2), of 609 adults with moderate to severe glabellar lines. The trials were conducted at 30 sites in the United States and Canada. Both trials enrolled participants 18 to 75 years old with moderate to severe glabellar lines. Participants received a single intramuscular injection of daxibotulinumtoxinA or placebo at five sites within the muscles between the eyebrows. The most common side effects of daxibotulinumtoxinA are headache, drooping eyelids, and weakness of facial muscles.

LetibotulinumtoxinA (Letybo) was approved for medical use in the United States in February 2024. It is indicated to temporarily improve the appearance of moderate-to-severe glabellar lines. The FDA approved letibotulinumtoxinA based on evidence from three clinical trials (BLESS I [NCT02677298], BLESS II [NCT02677805], and BLESS III [NCT03985982]) of 1,271 participants with moderate to severe wrinkles between the eyebrows for efficacy and safety assessment. These trials were conducted at 31 sites in the United States and the European Union. All three trials enrolled participants 18 to 75 years old with moderate to severe glabellar lines (wrinkles between the eyebrows). Participants received a single intramuscular injection of letibotulinumtoxinA or placebo at five sites within the muscles between the eyebrows. The most common side effects of letibotulinumtoxinA are headache, drooping of eyelid and brow, and twitching of eyelid.

=== Others ===
Botulinum toxin is also used to treat disorders of hyperactive nerves including excessive sweating, neuropathic pain, and some allergy symptoms. In addition to these uses, botulinum toxin is being evaluated for use in treating chronic pain. Studies show that botulinum toxin may be injected into arthritic shoulder joints to reduce chronic pain and improve range of motion. The use of botulinum toxin A in children with cerebral palsy is safe in the upper and lower limb muscles.

== Side effects ==
While botulinum toxin is generally considered safe in a clinical setting, serious side effects from its use can occur. Most commonly, botulinum toxin can be injected into the wrong muscle group or with time spread from the injection site, causing temporary paralysis of unintended muscles. In at least three cases temporary diplopia was reported due to subcutaneous injections for cosmetic purposes.

Side effects from cosmetic use generally result from unintended paralysis of facial muscles. These include partial facial paralysis, muscle weakness, and trouble swallowing. Side effects are not limited to direct paralysis, however, and can also include headaches, flu-like symptoms, and allergic reactions. Just as cosmetic treatments only last a number of months, paralysis side effects can have the same durations. At least in some cases, these effects are reported to dissipate in the weeks after treatment. Bruising at the site of injection is not a side effect of the toxin, but rather of the mode of administration, and is reported as preventable if the clinician applies pressure to the injection site; when it occurs, it is reported in specific cases to last 7–11 days. When injecting the masseter muscle of the jaw, loss of muscle function can result in a loss or reduction of power to chew solid foods. With continued high doses, the muscles can atrophy or lose strength; research has shown that those muscles rebuild after a break from Botox.

Side effects from therapeutic use can be much more varied depending on the location of injection and the dose of toxin injected. In general, side effects from therapeutic use can be more serious than those that arise during cosmetic use. These can arise from paralysis of critical muscle groups and can include arrhythmia, heart attack, and in some cases, seizures, respiratory arrest, and death. Additionally, side effects common in cosmetic use are also common in therapeutic use, including trouble swallowing, muscle weakness, allergic reactions, and flu-like syndromes.

In response to the occurrence of these side effects, in 2008, the US Food and Drug Administration (FDA) notified the public of the potential dangers of the botulinum toxin as a therapeutic. Namely, the toxin can spread to areas distant from the site of injection and paralyze unintended muscle groups, especially when used for treating muscle spasticity in children treated for cerebral palsy. In 2009, the FDA announced that boxed warnings would be added to available botulinum toxin products, warning of their ability to spread from the injection site. However, the clinical use of botulinum toxin A in children with cerebral palsy has been proven to be safe with minimal side effects. Additionally, the FDA announced name changes to several botulinum toxin products, to emphasize that the products are not interchangeable and require different doses for proper use. Botox and Botox Cosmetic were given the generic name of onabotulinumtoxinA, Myobloc as rimabotulinumtoxinB, and Dysport retained its generic name of abobotulinumtoxinA. In conjunction with this, the FDA issued a communication to health care professionals reiterating the new drug names and the approved uses for each. A similar warning was issued by Health Canada in 2009, warning that botulinum toxin products can spread to other parts of the body.

== Role in disease ==
Botulinum toxin produced by Clostridium botulinum (an anaerobic, gram-positive bacterium) is the cause of botulism. Humans most commonly ingest the toxin from eating improperly canned foods in which C. botulinum has grown. However, the toxin can also be introduced through an infected wound. In infants, the bacteria can sometimes grow in the intestines and produce botulinum toxin within the intestine and can cause a condition known as floppy baby syndrome. In all cases, the toxin can then spread, blocking nerves and muscle function. In severe cases, the toxin can block nerves controlling the respiratory system or heart, resulting in death.

Botulism can be difficult to diagnose, as it may appear similar to diseases such as Guillain–Barré syndrome, myasthenia gravis, and stroke. Other tests, such as brain scan and spinal fluid examination, may help to rule out other causes. If the symptoms of botulism are diagnosed early, various treatments can be administered. In an effort to remove contaminated food that remains in the gut, enemas or induced vomiting may be used. For wound infections, infected material may be removed surgically. Botulinum antitoxin is available and may be used to prevent the worsening of symptoms, though it will not reverse existing nerve damage. In severe cases, mechanical respiration may be used to support people with respiratory failure. The nerve damage heals over time, generally over weeks to months. With proper treatment, the case fatality rate for botulinum poisoning can be greatly reduced.

Two preparations of botulinum antitoxins are available for treatment of botulism. Trivalent (serotypes A, B, E) botulinum antitoxin is derived from equine sources using whole antibodies. The second antitoxin is heptavalent botulinum antitoxin (serotypes A, B, C, D, E, F, G), which is derived from equine antibodies that have been altered to make them less immunogenic. This antitoxin is effective against all main strains of botulism.

== Mechanism of action ==
Target molecules of botulinum neurotoxin (abbreviated BoNT) and tetanus neurotoxin (TeNT), toxins acting inside the axon terminal

The toxin cleaves SNARE proteins, preventing the release of acetylcholine at the neuromuscular junction and producing flaccid paralysis.

Botulinum toxin exerts its effect by cleaving key proteins required for nerve activation. First, the toxin binds specifically to presynaptic surface of neurons that use the neurotransmitter acetylcholine. Once bound to the nerve terminal, the neuron takes up the toxin into a vesicle by receptor-mediated endocytosis. As the vesicle moves farther into the cell, it acidifies, activating a portion of the toxin that triggers it to push across the vesicle membrane and into the cell cytoplasm. Botulinum neurotoxins recognize distinct classes of receptors simultaneously (gangliosides, synaptotagmin and SV2). Once inside the cytoplasm, the toxin cleaves SNARE proteins (proteins that mediate vesicle fusion, with their target membrane bound compartments) meaning that the acetylcholine vesicles cannot bind to the intracellular cell membrane, preventing the cell from releasing vesicles of neurotransmitter. This stops nerve signaling, leading to flaccid paralysis.

The toxin itself is released from the bacterium as a single chain, then becomes activated when cleaved by its own proteases. The active form consists of a two-chain protein composed of a 100-kDa heavy chain polypeptide joined via disulfide bond to a 50-kDa light chain polypeptide. The heavy chain contains domains with several functions; it has the domain responsible for binding specifically to presynaptic nerve terminals, as well as the domain responsible for mediating translocation of the light chain into the cell cytoplasm as the vacuole acidifies. The light chain is a M27-family zinc metalloprotease and is the active part of the toxin. It is translocated into the host cell cytoplasm where it cleaves the host protein SNAP-25, a member of the SNARE protein family, which is responsible for fusion. The cleaved SNAP-25 cannot mediate fusion of vesicles with the host cell membrane, thus preventing the release of the neurotransmitter acetylcholine from axon endings. This blockage is slowly reversed as the toxin loses activity and the SNARE proteins are slowly regenerated by the affected cell.

The seven toxin serotypes (A–G) are traditionally separated by their antigenicity. They have different tertiary structures and sequence differences. While the different toxin types all target members of the SNARE family, different toxin types target different SNARE family members. The A, B, and E serotypes cause human botulism, with the activities of types A and B enduring longest in vivo (from several weeks to months). Existing toxin types can recombine to create "hybrid" (mosaic, chimeric) types. Examples include BoNT/CD, BoNT/DC, and BoNT/FA, with the first letter indicating the light chain type and the latter indicating the heavy chain type. BoNT/FA received considerable attention under the name "BoNT/H", as it was mistakenly thought it could not be neutralized by any existing antitoxin.

Botulinum toxins are closely related to tetanus toxin. The two are collectively known as Clostridium neurotoxins and the light chain is classified by MEROPS as family M27. Clostridium neurotoxins belong in the wider family of AB toxins, which also includes Anthrax toxin and Diphtheria toxin. Nonclassical types include BoNT/X (P0DPK1), which is toxic in mice and possibly in humans; a BoNT/J (A0A242DI27) found in cow Enterococcus; and a BoNT/Wo (A0A069CUU9) found in the rice-colonizing Weissella oryzae.

== History ==
=== Initial descriptions and discovery ===
One of the earliest recorded outbreaks of foodborne botulism occurred in 1793 in the village of Wildbad in what is now Baden-Württemberg, Germany. Thirteen people became sick and six died after eating pork stomach filled with blood sausage, a local delicacy. Additional cases of fatal food poisoning in Württemberg led the authorities to issue a public warning against consuming smoked blood sausages in 1802 and to collect case reports of "sausage poisoning". Between 1817 and 1822, the German physician Justinus Kerner published the first complete description of the symptoms of botulism, based on extensive clinical observations and animal experiments. He concluded that the toxin develops in bad sausages under anaerobic conditions, is a biological substance, acts on the nervous system, and is lethal even in small amounts. Kerner hypothesized that this "sausage toxin" could be used to treat a variety of diseases caused by an overactive nervous system, making him the first to suggest that it could be used therapeutically. In 1870, the German physician John Müller coined the term botulism to describe the disease caused by sausage poisoning, from the Latin word botulus, meaning 'sausage'.

In 1895, Émile van Ermengem, a Belgian microbiologist, discovered what is now known as Clostridium botulinum and confirmed that a toxin produced by the bacteria causes botulism. On 14 December 1895, there was a large outbreak of botulism in the Belgian village of Ellezelles that occurred at a funeral where people ate pickled and smoked ham; three of them died. By examining the contaminated ham and performing autopsies on the people who died after eating it, van Ermengem isolated an anaerobic microorganism that he called Bacillus botulinus. He also performed experiments on animals with ham extracts, isolated bacterial cultures, and toxins extracts from the bacteria. From these he concluded that the bacteria themselves do not cause foodborne botulism, but rather produce a toxin that causes the disease when ingested. As a result of Kerner's and van Ermengem's research, it was thought that only contaminated meat or fish could cause botulism. This idea was refuted in 1904 when a botulism outbreak occurred in Darmstadt, Germany, because of canned white beans. In 1910, the German microbiologist J. Leuchs published a paper showing that different strains of Bacillus botulinus caused the outbreaks in Ellezelles and Darmstad and that the toxins were serologically distinct. In 1917, Bacillus botulinus was renamed Clostridium botulinum, as it was decided that the term Bacillus should refer to a group of aerobic microorganisms, while Clostridium would be used only to describe a group of anaerobic microorganisms. In 1919, Georgina Burke used toxin-antitoxin reactions to identify two strains of Clostridium botulinum, which she designated A and B.

=== Food canning ===
Over the next three decades, 1895–1925, as food canning was approaching a billion-dollar-a-year industry, botulism was becoming a public health hazard. Karl Friedrich Meyer, a Swiss-American veterinary scientist, created a center at the Hooper Foundation in San Francisco, where he developed techniques for growing the organism and extracting the toxin, and conversely, for preventing organism growth and toxin production, and inactivating the toxin by heating. The California canning industry was thereby preserved.

=== World War II ===
With the outbreak of World War II, weaponization of botulinum toxin was investigated at Fort Detrick in Maryland. Carl Lamanna and James Duff developed the concentration and crystallization techniques that Edward J. Schantz used to create the first clinical product. When the Army's Chemical Corps was disbanded, Schantz moved to the Food Research Institute in Wisconsin, where he manufactured toxin for experimental use and provided it to the academic community.

The mechanism of botulinum toxin action – blocking the release of the neurotransmitter acetylcholine from nerve endings – was elucidated in the mid-20th century, and remains an important research topic. Nearly all toxin treatments are based on this effect in various body tissues.

=== Cold War ===
The Soviet biological weapons program began a program focusing on botulinum toxin from 1951 at the Ministry of Defence's Scientific-Research Institute of Hygiene in Sverdlovsk Oblast.

The United States biological weapons program possessed botulinum toxin before it was disbanded in 1969.

The Iraqi biological weapons program began developing botulinum toxin at its Al Hakum production plant from 1989, the basis for which it originally received among a range of agents from the American Type Culture Collection in 1988.

=== Strabismus ===
Ophthalmologists specializing in eye muscle disorders (strabismus) had developed the method of EMG-guided injection (using the electromyogram, the electrical signal from an activated muscle, to guide injection) of local anesthetics as a diagnostic technique for evaluating an individual muscle's contribution to an eye movement. Because strabismus surgery frequently needed repeating, a search was undertaken for non-surgical, injection treatments using various anesthetics, alcohols, enzymes, enzyme blockers, and snake neurotoxins. Finally, inspired by Daniel B. Drachman's work with chicks at Johns Hopkins, Alan B. Scott and colleagues injected botulinum toxin into monkey extraocular muscles. The result was remarkable; a few picograms induced paralysis that was confined to the target muscle, long in duration, and without side effects.

After working out techniques for freeze-drying, buffering with albumin, and assuring sterility, potency, and safety, Scott applied to the FDA for investigational drug use, and began manufacturing botulinum type A neurotoxin in his San Francisco lab. He injected the first strabismus patients in 1977, reported its clinical utility in 1980, and had soon trained hundreds of ophthalmologists in EMG-guided injection of the drug he named Oculinum ("eye aligner").

In 1986, Oculinum Inc, Scott's micromanufacturer and distributor of botulinum toxin, was unable to obtain product liability insurance, and could no longer supply the drug. As supplies became exhausted, people who had come to rely on periodic injections became desperate. For four months, as liability issues were resolved, American blepharospasm patients traveled to Canadian eye centers for their injections.

Based on data from thousands of people collected by 240 investigators, Oculinum Inc (which was soon acquired by Allergan) received FDA approval in 1989 to market Oculinum for clinical use in the United States to treat adult strabismus (crossed eyes) and blepharospasm (uncontrollable blinking). Allergan then began using the trademark Botox. This original approval was granted under the 1983 US Orphan Drug Act.

=== Cosmetics ===
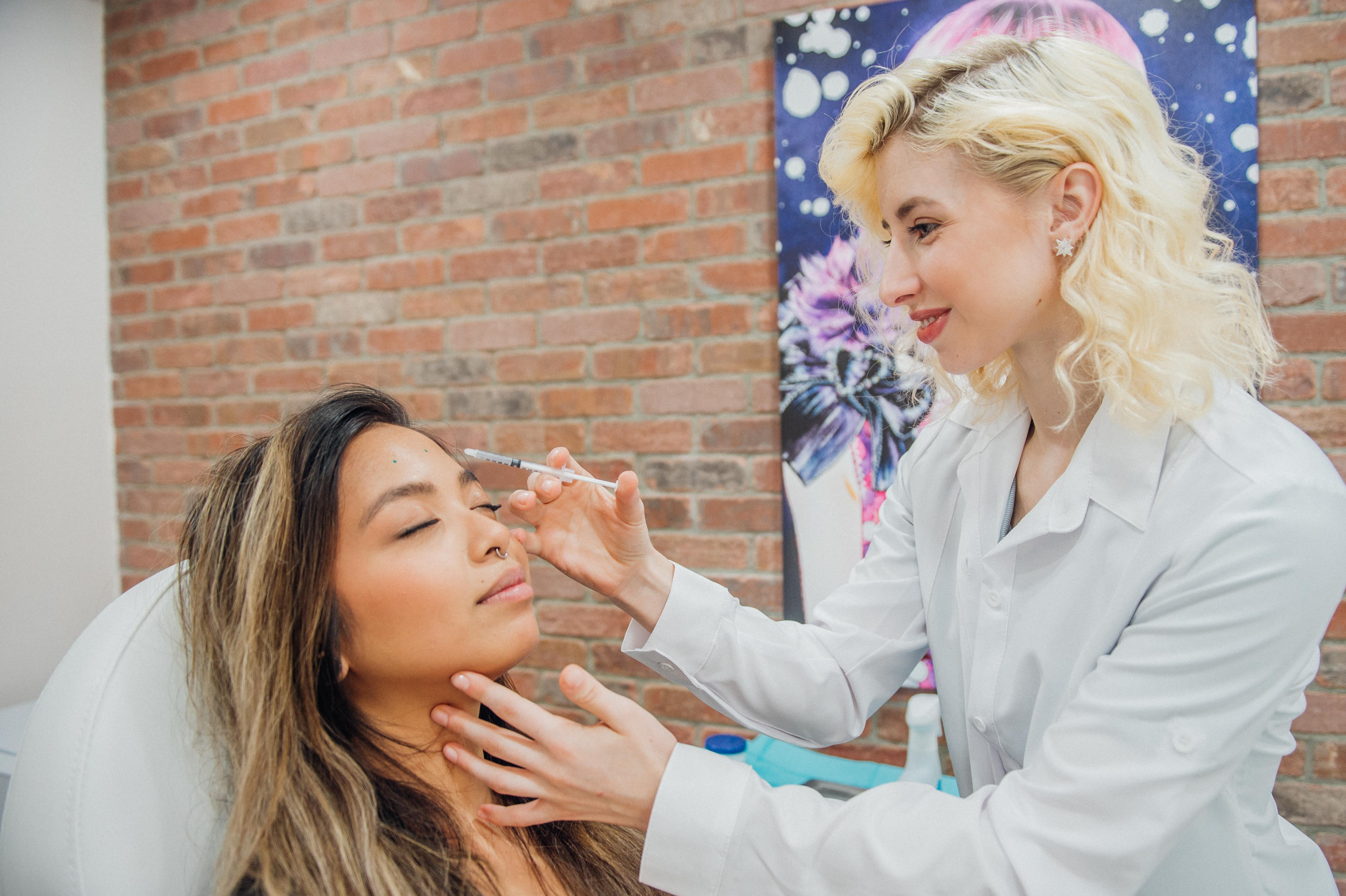
botulinum toxin injection

The effect of botulinum toxin type-A on reducing and eliminating forehead wrinkles was first described and published by Richard Clark, MD, a plastic surgeon from Sacramento, California. In 1987 Clark was challenged with eliminating the disfigurement caused by only the right side of the forehead muscles functioning after the left side of the forehead was paralyzed during a facelift procedure. This patient had desired to look better from her facelift, but was experiencing bizarre unilateral right forehead eyebrow elevation while the left eyebrow drooped, and she constantly demonstrated deep expressive right forehead wrinkles while the left side was perfectly smooth due to the paralysis. Clark was aware that botulinum toxin was safely being used to treat babies with strabismus and he requested and was granted FDA approval to experiment with botulinum toxin to paralyze the moving and wrinkling normal functioning right forehead muscles to make both sides of the forehead appear the same. This study and case report of the cosmetic use of botulinum toxin to treat a cosmetic complication of a cosmetic surgery was the first report on the specific treatment of wrinkles and was published in the journal Plastic and Reconstructive Surgery in 1989. Editors of the journal of the American Society of Plastic Surgeons have clearly stated "the first described use of the toxin in aesthetic circumstances was by Clark and Berris in 1989."

J. D. and J. A. Carruthers also studied and reported in 1992 the use of botulinum toxin type-A as a cosmetic treatment.[78] They conducted a study of participants whose only concern was their glabellar forehead wrinkle or furrow. Study participants were otherwise normal. Sixteen of seventeen participants available for follow-up demonstrated a cosmetic improvement. This study was reported at a meeting in 1991. The study for the treatment of glabellar frown lines was published in 1992. This result was subsequently confirmed by other groups (Brin, and the Columbia University group under Monte Keen). The FDA announced regulatory approval of botulinum toxin type A (Botox Cosmetic) to temporarily improve the appearance of moderate-to-severe frown lines between the eyebrows (glabellar lines) in 2002 after extensive clinical trials. Well before this, the cosmetic use of botulinum toxin type A became widespread. The results of Botox Cosmetic can last up to four months and may vary with each patient. The US Food and Drug Administration (FDA) approved an alternative product-safety testing method in response to increasing public concern that LD50 testing was required for each batch sold in the market.

Botulinum toxin type-A has also been used in the treatment of gummy smiles; the material is injected into the hyperactive muscles of upper lip, which causes a reduction in the upward movement of lip thus resulting in a smile with a less exposure of gingiva. Botox is usually injected in the three lip elevator muscles that converge on the lateral side of the ala of the nose; the levator labii superioris (LLS), the levator labii superioris alaeque nasi muscle (LLSAN), and the zygomaticus minor (ZMi).

In 2025 there were 19,701 professionals administering botox in the United Kingdom, an increase of 437% since 2023. There was a similar increase in the USA.

=== Chronic pain ===
William J. Binder reported in 2000 that people who had cosmetic injections around the face reported relief from chronic headaches. This was initially thought to be an indirect effect of reduced muscle tension; however, the toxin is now known to inhibit the release of peripheral nociceptive neurotransmitters, thereby suppressing the central pain processing systems responsible for migraine headaches.

== Research ==
=== Blepharospasm and strabismus ===
University-based ophthalmologists in the US and Canada further refined the use of botulinum toxin as a therapeutic agent. By 1985, a scientific protocol of injection sites and dosage had been empirically determined for treatment of blepharospasm and strabismus. Side effects in treatment of this condition were deemed to be rare, mild and treatable. The beneficial effects of the injection lasted only four to six months. Thus, blepharospasm patients required re-injection two or three times a year.

In 1986, Scott's micromanufacturer and distributor of Botox was no longer able to supply the drug because of an inability to obtain product liability insurance. People became desperate, as supplies of Botox were gradually consumed, forcing him to abandon people who would have been due for their next injection. For a period of four months, American blepharospasm patients had to arrange to have their injections performed by participating doctors at Canadian eye centers until the liability issues could be resolved.

In December 1989, Botox was approved by the US FDA for the treatment of strabismus, blepharospasm, and hemifacial spasm in people over 12 years old.

In the case of treatment of infantile esotropia in people younger than 12 years of age, several studies have yielded differing results.

=== Upper motor neuron syndrome ===
Botulinum toxin type-A is now a common treatment for muscles affected by the upper motor neuron syndrome (UMNS), such as cerebral palsy, for muscles with an impaired ability to effectively lengthen. Muscles affected by UMNS frequently are limited by weakness, loss of reciprocal inhibition, decreased movement control, and hypertonicity (including spasticity). In January 2014, botulinum toxin was approved by UK's Medicines and Healthcare products Regulatory Agency (MHRA) for the treatment of ankle disability due to lower limb spasticity associated with stroke in adults. Joint motion may be restricted by severe muscle imbalance related to the syndrome, when some muscles are markedly hypertonic, and lack effective active lengthening. Injecting an overactive muscle to decrease its level of contraction can allow improved reciprocal motion, so improved ability to move and exercise.

=== Sialorrhea ===
Sialorrhea is a condition where oral secretions are unable to be eliminated, causing pooling of saliva in the mouth. This condition can be caused by various neurological syndromes such as Bell's palsy, intellectual disability, and cerebral palsy. Injection of botulinum toxin type-A into salivary glands is useful in reducing the secretions.

=== Cervical dystonia ===
Botulinum toxin type-A is used to treat cervical dystonia, but it can become ineffective after a time. Botulinum toxin type B received FDA approval for treatment of cervical dystonia in December 2000. Brand names for botulinum toxin type-B include Myobloc in the United States and Neurobloc in the European Union.

=== Chronic migraine ===
Onabotulinumtoxin A (trade name: Botox) received FDA approval for treatment of chronic migraines on 15 October 2010. The toxin is injected into the head and neck to treat these chronic headaches. Approval followed evidence presented to the agency from two studies funded by Allergan showing a very slight improvement in incidence of chronic migraines for those with migraines undergoing the Botox treatment.

Since then, several randomized control trials have shown botulinum toxin type A to improve headache symptoms and quality of life when used prophylactically for participants with chronic migraine who exhibit headache characteristics consistent with: pressure perceived from outside source, shorter total duration of chronic migraines (<30 years), "detoxification" of participants with coexisting chronic daily headache due to medication overuse, and no current history of other preventive headache medications.

=== Depression ===
A few small trials have found benefits in people with depression. A 2021 meta-analysis supports the usefulness of botox in unipolar depression, but finds significant heterogenity among the findings. The main hypothesis for its action is based on the facial feedback hypothesis. Another hypothesis involves a connection between the facial muscle and specific brain regions in animals, but additional evidence is required to support or disprove this theory.

=== Premature ejaculation ===
The drug for the treatment of premature ejaculation has been under development since August 2013, and is in Phase II trials.
