= Infantile esotropia =

Condition in which one or either eye turns inward

- Specialty: Ophthalmology

Infantile esotropia is an ocular condition of early onset in which one or either eye turns inward. It is a specific sub-type of esotropia and has been a subject of much debate amongst ophthalmologists with regard to its naming, diagnostic features, and treatment.

== Presentation ==
Historically the term 'congenital strabismus' was used to describe constant esotropias with onset between birth and six months of age. However, this term was felt to be an inadequate classification as it covered a variety of esotropias with different causes, features and prognoses.

In 1988, American ophthalmologist Gunter K. Von Noorden discussed what he described as 'Essential Infantile Esotropia'. He described the condition as: "early acquired, not... congenital ..., although congenital factors may favor its development between the ages of 3 and 6 months".

He identified this squint sub-type as having the following features:

1. Onset between birth and six months of age.
2. Large size (greater than 30 dioptres)
3. Stable size
4. Not associated with abnormalities of the central nervous system.
5. Often associated with defective abduction (outward movement) and excessive adduction (inward movement) of the eyes.
6. Also associated with oblique muscle dysfunction and Dissociated Vertical Deviation.
7. Initial alternation of the squint present with crossed fixation, i.e. the affected individual uses the left eye to look right and the right eye to look left.
8. Limited potential for binocular vision.

The same condition had also previously been described by other ophthalmologists, notably Cianca (1962) who named it Cianca's Syndrome and noted the presence of manifest latent nystagmus, and Lang (1968) who called it Congenital Esotropia Syndrome and noted the presence of abnormal head postures. In both cases, however, the essential characteristics were the same, but with emphasis placed on different elements of the condition.

Helveston (1993) further clarified and expanded upon von Noorden's work, and incorporated the work of both Lang and Cianca into his summary of the characteristics of the condition:

1. Esotropia between 10 and 90 dioptres in size
2. Either alternation or fixation preference may be present (if the latter then amblyopia may result).
3. Neurologically normal.
4. Hyperopic correction does not eliminate or significantly reduce the squint size.
5. Frequent nystagmus (latent or manifest latent).
6. The patient may or may not have any or all of the following associated conditions: Oblique muscle dysfunction, vertical incomitance, dissociated vertical deviation, asymmetric optokinetic nystagmus, torticollis.
7. Presence will be 'confirmed' by six months.
8. Best treatment results in subnormal binocular vision.

The expressions congenital esotropia, infantile esoptropia, idiopathic infantile esotropia and essential infantile esotropia are often used interchangeably.

=== Cross-fixation ===
Cross-fixation congenital esotropia, also called Cianci's syndrome is a particular type of large-angle infantile esotropia associated with tight medius rectus muscles. With the tight muscles, which hinder adduction, there is a constant inward eye turn. The patient cross-fixates, that is, to fixate objects on the left, the patient looks across the nose with the right eye, and vice versa. The patient tends to adopt a head turn, turning the head to the right to better see objects in the left visual field and turning the head to the left to see those in the right visual field. Binasal occlusion can be used to discourage cross-fixation. However, the management of cross-fixation congenital esotropia usually involves surgery.

== Cause ==
This remains undetermined at the present time. A recent study by Major et al. reports that:

Prematurity, family history or secondary ocular history, perinatal or gestational complications, systemic disorders, use of supplemental oxygen as a neonate, use of systemic medications, and male sex were found to be significant risk factors for infantile esotropia.

Further recent evidence indicates that a cause for infantile strabismus may lie with the input that is provided to the visual cortex. In particular, neonates who suffer injuries that, directly or indirectly, perturb binocular inputs into the primary visual cortex (V1) have a far higher risk of developing strabismus than other infants.

== Diagnosis ==
=== Differential diagnosis ===
Clinically Infantile esotropia must be distinguished from:

1. VIth Cranial nerve or abducens palsy
2. Nystagmus Blockage Syndrome
3. Esotropia arising secondary to central nervous system abnormalities (in cerebral palsy for example)
4. Primary Constant esotropia
5. Duane's Syndrome

== Treatment ==
According to a Cochrane review of 2023, controversies remain regarding type of surgery, non-surgical intervention and age of intervention and that more good studies are needed to guide clinical practice.

The aims of treatment are as follows:

- The elimination of any amblyopia
- A cosmetically acceptable ocular alignment
- Long-term stability of eye position
- Binocular cooperation

=== Initially ===
It is essential that a child with strabismus is presented to the ophthalmologist as early as possible for diagnosis and treatment in order to allow best possible monocular and binocular vision to develop. Initially, the patient will have a full eye examination to identify any associated pathology, and any glasses required to optimise acuity will be prescribed – although infantile esotropia is not typically associated with refractive error. Studies have found that approximately 15% of infantile esotropia patients have accommodative esotropia. For these patients, antiaccommodative therapy (with spectacles) is indicated before any surgery as antiaccommodative therapy fully corrects their esotropia in many cases and significantly decreases their deviation angle in others.

Amblyopia will be treated via occlusion treatment (using patching or atropine drops) of the non-squinting eye with the aim of achieving full alternation of fixation. Management thereafter will be surgical. As alternative to surgery, also botulinum toxin therapy has been used in children with infantile esotropia. Furthermore, as accompaniment to ophthalmologic treatment, craniosacral therapy may be performed in order to relieve tension

=== Surgery ===
Controversy has arisen regarding the selection and planning of surgical procedures, the timing of surgery and about what constitutes a favourable outcome.

1. Selection and planning

Some ophthalmologists, notably Ing and Helveston, favour a prescribed approach often involving multiple surgical episodes whereas others prefer to aim for full alignment of the eyes in one procedure and let the number of muscles operated upon during this procedure be determined by the size of the squint.

2. Timing and outcome

This debate relates to the technical anatomical difficulties of operating on the very young versus the possibility of an increased potential for binocularity associated with early surgery. Infants are often operated upon at the age of six to nine months of age and in some cases even earlier at three or four months of age. Some emphasize the importance of intervening early such as to keep the duration of the patient's abnormal visual experience to a minimum. Advocates of early surgery believe that those who have their surgery before the age of one are more likely to be able to use both eyes together post-operatively.

A Dutch study (ELISSS) compared early with late surgery in a prospective, controlled, non-randomized, multicenter trial and reported that:

Children operated early had better gross stereopsis at age six as compared to children operated late. They had been operated more frequently, however, and a substantial number of children in both [originally-recruited] groups had not been operated at all.

Other studies also report better results with early surgery, notably Birch and Stager and Murray et al. but do not comment on the number of operations undertaken. A recent study on 38 children concluded that surgery for infantile esotropia is most likely to result in measureable stereopsis if patient age at alignment is not more than 16 months. Another study found that for children with infantile esotropia early surgery decreases the risk of dissociated vertical deviation developing after surgery. A study published 2022 concluded that quality of stereopsis and binocular vision may benefit from surgery being performed within six months of the onset of infantile esotropia.

Aside the strabismus itself, there are other aspects or conditions that appear to improve after surgery or botulinum toxin eye alignment. Study outcomes have indicated that after surgery the child catches up in development of fine-motor skills (such as grasping a toy and handling a bottle) and of large-muscle skills (such as sitting, standing, and walking) in case a developmental delay was present before. Evidence also indicates that as of the age of six, strabismic children become less accepted by their peers, leaving them potentially exposed to social exclusion starting at this age unless their eye positioning is corrected by this time (see also: Psychosocial effects of strabismus).
