= Nystagmus =

Dysfunction of eye movement

- Other names: Dancing eyes, Instabilitas oculorum
- Horizontal optokinetic nystagmus, a normal (physiological) form of nystagmus
- Specialty: Neurology, ophthalmology, optometry

Nystagmus is a condition of involuntary (or voluntary, in some cases) eye movement. People can be born with it but more commonly acquire it in infancy or later in life. In many cases it may result in reduced or limited vision.

In normal eyesight, while the head rotates about an axis, distant visual images are sustained by rotating eyes in the opposite direction of the respective axis. The semicircular canals in the vestibule of the ear sense angular acceleration, and send signals to the nuclei for eye movement in the brain. From here, a signal is relayed to the extraocular muscles to allow one's gaze to fix on an object as the head moves. Nystagmus occurs when the semicircular canals are stimulated (e.g., by means of the caloric test, or by disease) while the head is stationary. The direction of ocular movement is related to the semicircular canal that is being stimulated.

There are two key forms of nystagmus: pathological and physiological, with variations within each type. Physiological nystagmus occurs under normal conditions in healthy subjects. Nystagmus may be caused by congenital disorder or sleep deprivation, acquired or central nervous system disorders, toxicity, pharmaceutical drugs, alcohol, or rotational movement. Previously considered untreatable, in recent years several drugs have been identified for treatment of nystagmus. Nystagmus is also occasionally associated with vertigo.

== Causes ==
Nystagmus as seen in a case of ocular albinism

The cause of pathological nystagmus may be congenital, idiopathic, or secondary to a pre-existing neurological disorder. It also may be induced temporarily by disorientation (such as on roller coaster rides or when a person has been spinning in circles) or by some drugs (alcohol, lidocaine, and other central nervous system depressants, inhalant drugs, stimulants, psychedelics, and dissociative drugs).

=== Early-onset nystagmus ===
Early-onset nystagmus occurs more frequently than acquired nystagmus. It can be insular or accompany other disorders (such as micro-ophthalmic anomalies or Down syndrome). Early-onset nystagmus itself is usually mild and non-progressive. The affected persons are usually unaware of their spontaneous eye movements, but vision can be impaired depending on the severity of the eye movements.

Types of early-onset nystagmus include the following, along with some of their causes:

- Infantile:
  - Albinism
  - Aniridia
  - Bilateral congenital cataract
  - Bilateral optic nerve hypoplasia
  - Idiopathic
  - Leber's congenital amaurosis
  - Optic nerve or macular disease
  - Persistent tunica vasculosa lentis
  - Rod monochromatism
  - Visual-motor syndrome of functional monophthalmus
- Latent nystagmus
- Noonan syndrome
- Nystagmus blockage syndrome

X-linked infantile nystagmus is associated with mutations of the gene FRMD7, which is located on the X chromosome.

Infantile nystagmus is also associated with two X-linked eye diseases known as complete congenital stationary night blindness (CSNB) and incomplete CSNB (iCSNB or CSNB-2), which are caused by mutations of one of two genes located on the X chromosome. In CSNB, mutations are found in NYX (nyctalopin). CSNB-2 involves mutations of CACNA1F, a voltage-gated calcium channel that, when mutated, does not conduct ions.

=== Acquired nystagmus ===
Nystagmus that occurs later in childhood or in adulthood is called acquired nystagmus. The cause is often unknown, or idiopathic, and thus referred to as idiopathic nystagmus. Other common causes include diseases and disorders of the central nervous system, metabolic disorders and alcohol and drug toxicity. In the elderly, stroke is the most common cause.

==== General diseases and conditions ====
Some of the diseases that present nystagmus as a pathological sign or symptom are as follows:

- Aniridia
- Benign paroxysmal positional vertigo

- Brain tumors (medulloblastoma, astrocytoma, or other tumors in the posterior fossa.)
- Canavan disease
- COVID-19
- Head trauma
- Decompression Illness (DCI)
- Lateral medullary syndrome
- Ménière's disease and other balance disorders
- Multiple sclerosis
- Optic nerve hypoplasia
- Pelizaeus–Merzbacher disease
- Superior canal dehiscence syndrome
- Tullio phenomenon
- Whipple's disease

==== Toxicity or intoxication, metabolic disorders and combination ====
Sources of toxicity that could lead to nystagmus:

- Alcohol intoxication
- Amphetamines
- Barbiturates
- Benzodiazepines
- Dextromethorphan
- Ketamine
- Pregabalin
- Lithium
- MDMA
- Nitrous Oxide
- Phencyclidine (PCP)
- Phenytoin (Dilantin)
- Salicylates
- Selective serotonin reuptake inhibitors (SSRIs)
- Other anticonvulsants or sedatives
- Thiamine deficiency
  - Wernicke's encephalopathy
  - Wernicke–Korsakoff syndrome

==== Thiamine deficiency ====
Risk factors for thiamine deficiency, or beriberi, in turn include a diet of mostly white rice, as well as alcoholism, dialysis, chronic diarrhea, and taking high doses of diuretics. Rarely it may be due to a genetic condition that results in difficulties absorbing thiamine found in food. Wernicke encephalopathy and Korsakoff syndrome are forms of dry beriberi.

==== Central nervous system (CNS) diseases and disorders ====
Central nervous system disorders such as with a cerebellar problem, the nystagmus can be in any direction including horizontal. Purely vertical nystagmus usually originates in the central nervous system, but it is also an adverse effect commonly seen in high phenytoin toxicity. Other causes of toxicity that may result in nystagmus include:

- Brain abscess (cerebellar)
- Cerebellar ataxia
- Chiari malformation
- Multiple sclerosis
- Stroke
- Thalamic hemorrhage
- Trauma
- Tumor
- Infantile cerebellar retinal degeneration

=== Other causes ===
- Non-physiological
- Trochlear nerve malfunction
- Vestibular pathology (Ménière's disease, SCDS (superior canal dehiscence syndrome), BPPV, vestibular neuritis)
- Exposure to strong magnetic fields (as in MRI machines)
- Long-term exposure to low light conditions or darkness, called miner's nystagmus after 19th-century coal miners who developed nystagmus from working in the dark.
- A slightly different form of nystagmus may be produced voluntarily by some (8% of) people. Some can sustain it for up to 35 seconds, but most average around 5 seconds.

== Diagnosis ==
Fast-phase horizontal eye movement vision

Fast-phase vertical eye movement vision

Nystagmus is highly noticeable but rarely recognized. Nystagmus can be clinically investigated by using a number of non-invasive standard tests. The simplest one is the caloric reflex test, in which one ear canal is irrigated with warm or cold water or air. The temperature gradient provokes the stimulation of the horizontal semicircular canal and the consequent nystagmus. Nystagmus is often very commonly present with Chiari malformation.

The resulting movement of the eyes may be recorded and quantified by a special device called an electronystagmograph (ENG), a form of electrooculography (an electrical method of measuring eye movements using external electrodes), or an even less invasive device called a videonystagmograph (VNG), a form of video-oculography (VOG) (a video-based method of measuring eye movements using external small cameras built into head masks), administered by an audiologist. Special swinging chairs with electrical controls can be used to induce rotatory nystagmus.

Over the past forty years, objective eye-movement-recording techniques have been applied to the study of nystagmus, and the results have led to greater accuracy of measurement and understanding of the condition.

Orthoptists may also use an optokinetic drum, or electrooculography or Frenzel goggles to assess a patient's eye movements.

Nystagmus can be caused by subsequent foveation of moving objects, pathology, sustained rotation or substance use. Nystagmus is not to be confused with other superficially similar-appearing disorders of eye movements (saccadic oscillations) such as opsoclonus or ocular flutter that are composed purely of fast-phase (saccadic) eye movements, while nystagmus is characterized by the combination of a smooth pursuit, which usually acts to take the eye off the point of focus, interspersed with the saccadic movement that serves to bring the eye back on target. Without the use of objective recording techniques, it may be very difficult to distinguish among these conditions.

In medicine, the presence of nystagmus can be benign, or it can indicate an underlying visual or neurological problem.

=== Pathological nystagmus ===
Pathological nystagmus is characterized by "excessive drifts of stationary retinal images that degrades vision and may produce illusory motion of the seen world: oscillopsia (an exception is congenital nystagmus)".

Bechterew's phenomenon was discovered by Vladimir Bekhterev in 1883 in animal experiments. Specifically, if one side of the vestibular system is damaged, then due to the lack of vestibular signal from that side, the animal behaves with nystagmus and vertigo. After a while, due to vestibular compensation, nystagmus and vertigo stops. However, if then the other vestibular system is damaged, then nystagmus and vertigo occurs in the opposite direction. This is an early evidence of sensorimotor adaptation in the brain. It is rarely reported in humans.

When nystagmus occurs without fulfilling its normal function, it is pathologic (deviating from the healthy or normal condition). Pathological nystagmus is the result of damage to one or more components of the vestibular system, including the semicircular canals, otolith organs, and the vestibulocerebellum.

Pathological nystagmus generally causes a degree of vision impairment, although the severity of such impairment varies widely. Also, many blind people have nystagmus, which is one reason that some wear dark glasses.

==== Variations ====
- Central nystagmus occurs as a result of either normal or abnormal processes not related to the vestibular organ. For example, lesions of the midbrain or cerebellum can result in up- and down-beat nystagmus.
  - Gaze induced nystagmus occurs or is exacerbated as a result of changing one's gaze toward or away from a particular side which has an affected central apparatus.
- Peripheral nystagmus occurs as a result of either normal or diseased functional states of the vestibular system and may combine a rotational component with vertical or horizontal eye movements and may be spontaneous, positional, or evoked.
  - Positional nystagmus occurs when a person's head is in a specific position. An example of disease state in which this occurs is benign paroxysmal positional vertigo (BPPV).
  - Post rotational nystagmus occurs after an imbalance is created between a normal side and a diseased side by stimulation of the vestibular system by rapid shaking or rotation of the head.
  - Spontaneous nystagmus is nystagmus that occurs randomly, regardless of the position of the patient's head.

=== Physiological nystagmus ===
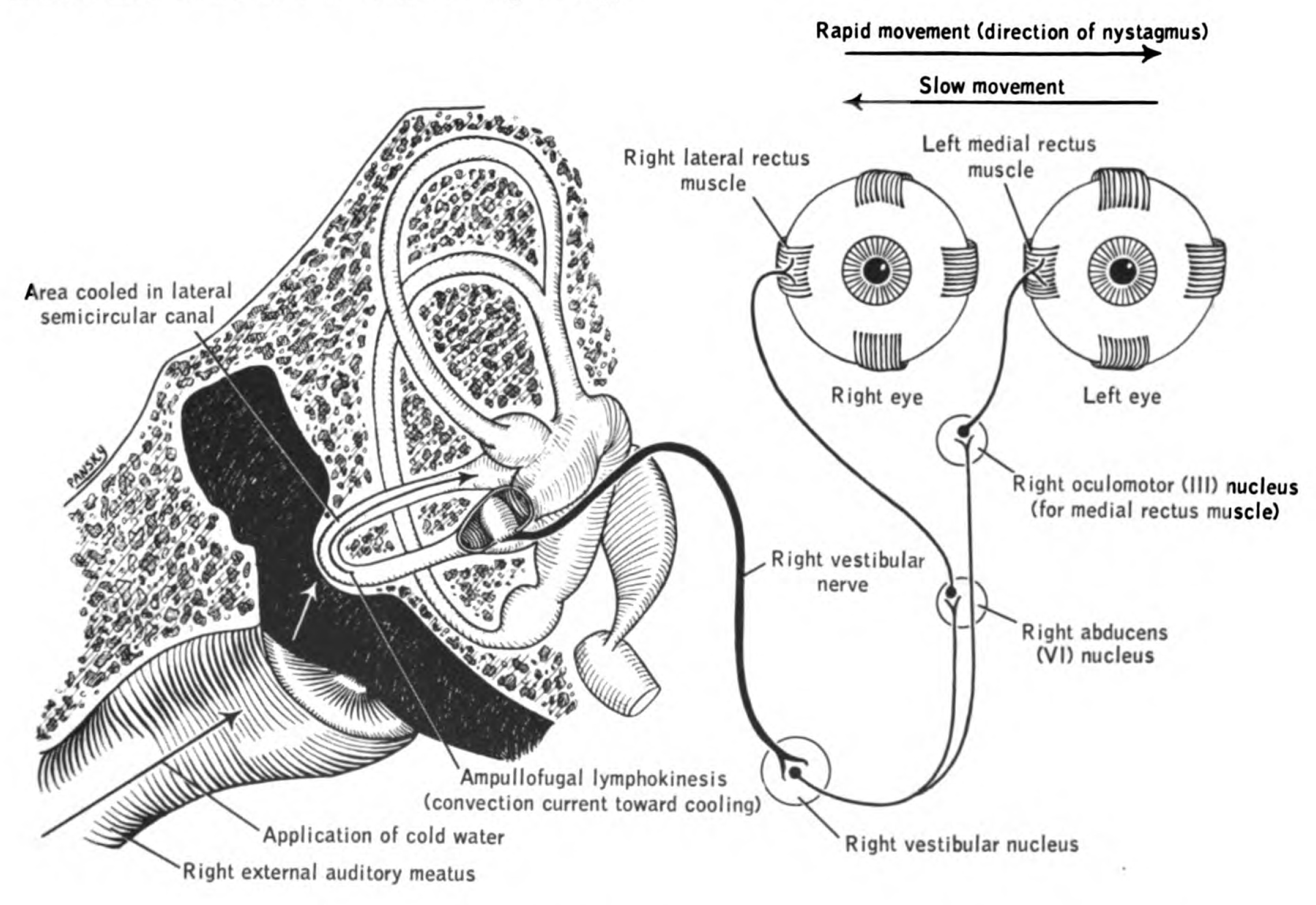
A diagram of the caloric reflex test, which tests the vestibulo-ocular reflex (VOR) by irrigating the ear canal with warm or cold water to induce physiological nystagmus. This image is showing effects of cold water introduced into right external meatus (Lawrence et al. 1960) - and these effects are opposite to that produced by introduction of hot water in same right ear.

Physiological nystagmus is a form of involuntary eye movement that is part of the vestibulo-ocular reflex (VOR), characterized by alternating smooth pursuit in one direction and saccadic movement in the other direction.

==== Variations ====
The direction of nystagmus is defined by the direction of its quick phase (e.g. a right-beating nystagmus is characterized by a rightward-moving quick phase, and a left-beating nystagmus by a leftward-moving quick phase). The oscillations may occur in the vertical, horizontal or torsional planes, or in any combination. The resulting nystagmus is often named as a gross description of the movement, e.g. downbeat nystagmus, upbeat nystagmus, seesaw nystagmus, periodic alternating nystagmus.

These descriptive names can be misleading, however, as many were assigned historically, solely on the basis of subjective clinical examination, which is not sufficient to determine the eyes' true trajectory.

- Optokinetic (syn. opticokinetic) nystagmus: a nystagmus induced by looking at moving visual stimuli, such as moving horizontal or vertical lines, and/or stripes. For example, if one fixates on a stripe of a rotating drum with alternating black and white, the gaze retreats to fixate on a new stripe as the drum moves. This is first a rotation with the same angular velocity, then returns in a saccade in the opposite direction. The process proceeds indefinitely. This is optokinetic nystagmus, and is a source for understanding the fixation reflex.
- Postrotatory nystagmus: if one spins in a chair continuously and stops suddenly, the fast phase of nystagmus is in the opposite direction of rotation, known as the "post-rotatory nystagmus", while slow phase is in the direction of rotation.

== Treatment ==
Congenital nystagmus has long been viewed as untreatable, but medications have been discovered that show promise in some patients. In 1980, researchers discovered that a drug called baclofen could stop periodic alternating nystagmus. Subsequently, gabapentin, an anticonvulsant, led to improvement in about half the patients who took it. Other drugs found to be effective against nystagmus in some patients include memantine, levetiracetam, 3,4-diaminopyridine (available in the US to eligible patients with downbeat nystagmus at no cost under an expanded access program), 4-aminopyridine, and acetazolamide. Several therapeutic approaches, such as contact lenses, drugs, surgery, and low vision rehabilitation have also been proposed. For example, it has been proposed that mini-telescopic eyeglasses suppress nystagmus.

Surgical treatment of congenital nystagmus is aimed at improving head posture, simulating artificial divergence, or weakening the horizontal recti muscles. Clinical trials of a surgery to treat nystagmus (known as tenotomy) concluded in 2001. Tenotomy is now being performed regularly at numerous centres around the world. The surgery aims to reduce the eye oscillations, which in turn tends to improve visual acuity.

Acupuncture tests have produced conflicting evidence on its beneficial effects on the symptoms of nystagmus. Benefits have been seen in treatments in which acupuncture points of the neck were used, specifically points on the sternocleidomastoid muscle. Benefits of acupuncture for treatment of nystagmus include a reduction in frequency and decreased slow phase velocities, which led to an increase in foveation duration periods both during and after treatment. By the standards of evidence-based medicine, the quality of these studies is poor (for example, Ishikawa's study had sample size of six subjects, was unblinded, and lacked proper controls), and given high quality studies showing that acupuncture has no effect beyond placebo, the results of these studies have to be considered clinically irrelevant until higher quality studies are performed.

Physical or occupational therapy is also used to treat nystagmus. Treatment consists of learning strategies to compensate for the impaired system.

A Cochrane Review on interventions for eye movement disorders due to acquired brain injury, updated in June 2017, identified three studies of pharmacological interventions for acquired nystagmus but concluded that these studies provided insufficient evidence to guide treatment choices.

== Epidemiology ==
Nystagmus is a relatively common clinical condition, affecting one in several thousand people. First descriptions date back to antiquity. A survey conducted in Oxfordshire, United Kingdom, found that by the age of two, one in every 670 children had manifested nystagmus. Authors of another study in the United Kingdom estimated an incidence of 24 in 10,000 (c. 0.240%), noting an apparently higher rate amongst white Europeans than in individuals of Asian origin.

== Law enforcement ==
In the United States, testing for horizontal gaze nystagmus is one of a battery of field sobriety tests used by police officers to determine whether a suspect is driving under the influence of alcohol. Horizontal gaze nystagmus will show if a subject is under the influence of a central nervous system depressant, an inhalant, or a dissociative anesthetic. The test involves observation of the suspect's pupil as it follows a moving object, noting

1. lack of smooth pursuit,
2. distinct and sustained nystagmus at maximum deviation, and
3. the onset of nystagmus prior to 45 degrees.

The horizontal gaze nystagmus test has been highly criticized and major errors in the testing methodology and analysis found. However, the validity of the horizontal gaze nystagmus test for use as a field sobriety test for persons with a blood alcohol level between 0.04 and 0.08 is supported by peer-reviewed studies and has been found to be a more accurate indication of blood alcohol content than other standard field sobriety tests.

== Media ==
My Dancing Eyes, a documentary by filmmaker Matt Morris, had participants explain what it is like to live with the eye condition, and was released for free. It was featured on NBN News, and ABC Radio Newcastle, in Australia.

== See also ==
- Bruns nystagmus
- Myoclonus
- Oscillopsia
- Opsoclonus
- Optokinetic nystagmus
