= Chronostasis =

Distortion in the perception of time

Stopped-clock illusion demonstration

Chronostasis (from Greek χρόνος, chrónos, 'time' and στάσις, stásis, 'standing') is a type of temporal illusion in which the first impression following the introduction of a new event or task-demand to the brain can appear to be extended in time. For example, chronostasis temporarily occurs when fixating on a target stimulus, immediately following a saccade (i.e., quick eye movement). This elicits an overestimation in the temporal duration for which that target stimulus (i.e., postsaccadic stimulus) was perceived. This effect can extend apparent durations by up to half a second and is consistent with the idea that the visual system models events prior to perception.

A common occurrence of this illusion is known as the stopped-clock illusion, where the second hand of an analog clock appears to stay still for longer than normal when first looked at.

This illusion can also occur in the auditory and tactile domain. For instance, a study suggests that a caller who listens to a ringing tone through a telephone while repetitively switching the receiver from one ear to the other may overestimate the temporal duration between rings.

== Mechanism of action ==
Overall, chronostasis occurs as a result of a disconnection in the communication between visual sensation and perception. Sensation, information collected from our eyes, is usually directly interpreted to create our perception. This perception is the collection of information that we consciously interpret from visual information. However, quick eye movements known as saccades disrupt this flow of information. Because research into the neurology associated with visual processing is ongoing, there is renewed debate regarding the exact timing of changes in perception that lead to chronostasis. However, below is a description of the general series of events that lead to chronostasis, using the example of a student looking up from their desk toward a clock in the classroom.

A timeline of the sensation and perception of chronostasis within the context of a student in a classroom

1. The eyes receive information from the environment regarding one particular focus. This sensory input is sent directly to the visual cortex to be processed. After visual processing, we consciously perceive this object of focus. In the context of a student in a classroom, the student's eyes focus on a paper on their desk. After their eyes collect light reflected off the paper and this information is processed in their visual cortex, the student consciously perceives the paper in front of them.
2. Following either a conscious decision or an involuntary perception of a stimulus in the periphery of the visual field, the eyes intend to move to a second target of interest. For the student described above, this may occur as they decide that they wish to check the clock at the front of the classroom.
3. The muscles of the eye contract and it begins to quickly move towards the second object of interest through an action known as a saccade. As soon as this saccade begins, a signal is sent from the eye back to the brain. This signal, known as an efferent cortical trigger or efference copy, communicates to the brain that a saccade is about to begin. During saccades, the sensitivity of visual information collected by the eyes is greatly reduced and, thus, any image collected during this saccade is very blurry. In order to prevent the visual cortex from processing blurred sensory information, visual information collected by the eyes during a saccade is suppressed through a process known as saccadic masking. This is also the same mechanism used to prevent the experience of motion blur.
4. Following the completion of the saccade, the eyes now focus on the second object of interest. As soon as the saccade concludes, another efferent cortical trigger is sent from the eyes back to the brain. This signal communicates to the brain that the saccade has concluded. Prompted by this signal, the visual cortex once again resumes processing visual information. For the student, their eyes have now reached the clock and their brain's visual cortex begins to process information from their eyes. However, this second efferent trigger also communicates to the brain that a period of time has been missing from perception. To fill this gap in perception, visual information is processed in a manner known as neural antedating or backdating. In this visual processing, the gap in perception is "filled in" with information gathered after the saccade. For the student, the gap of time that occurred during the saccade is substituted with the processed image of the clock. Thus, immediately following the saccade, the second hand of the clock appears to stop in place before moving.

In studying chronostasis and its underlying causes, there is potential bias in the experimental setting. In many experiments, participants are asked to perform some sort of task corresponding to sensory stimuli. This could cause the participants to anticipate stimuli, thus leading to bias. Also, many mechanisms involved in chronostasis are complex and difficult to measure. It is difficult for experimenters to observe the perceptive experiences of participants without "being inside their mind." Furthermore, experimenters normally do not have access to the neural circuitry and neurotransmitters located inside the braincases of their subjects.

== Modulating factors ==
Because of its complexity, there are various characteristics of stimuli and physiological actions that can alter the way one experiences chronostasis.

=== Saccadic amplitude ===
The greater the amplitude (or duration) of a saccade, the more severe the resulting overestimation. The further the student in the above example's eyes must travel in order to reach the clock, the more dramatic their perception of chronostasis. This connection supports the assertion that overestimation occurs in order to fill in the length of time omitted by saccadic masking. This would mean that, if the saccade lasted for a longer period of time, there would be more time that needed to be filled in with overestimation.

=== Attention redirection ===
When shifting focus from one object to a second object, the saccadic movement of one's eyes is also accompanied by a conscious shift of attention. In the context of the stopped clock illusion, not only do your eyes move, but you also shift your attention to the clock. This led researchers to question whether the movement of the eyes or simply the shift of the observer's attention towards the second stimulus initiated saccadic masking. Experiments in which subjects diverted only their attention without moving their eyes revealed that the redirection of attention alone was not enough to initiate chronostasis. This suggests that attention is not the time marker used when perception is filled back in. Rather, the physical movement of the eyes themselves serves as this critical marker. However, this relationship between attention and perception in the context of chronostasis is often difficult to measure and may be biased in a laboratory setting. Because subjects may be biased as they are instructed to perform actions or to redirect their attention, the concept of attention serving as a critical time marker for chronostasis may not be entirely dismissed.

=== Spatial continuity ===
Following investigation, one may wonder if chronostasis still occurs if the saccadic target is moving. In other words, would you still experience chronostasis if the clock you looked at were moving? Through experimentation, researchers found that the occurrence of chronostasis in the presence of a moving stimulus was dependent on the awareness of the subject. If the subject were aware that the saccadic target was moving, they would not experience chronostasis. Conversely, if the subject were not aware of the saccadic target's movement, they did experience chronostasis. This is likely because antedating does not occur in the case of a consciously moving target. If, after the saccade, the eye correctly falls on the target, the brain assumes this target has been at this location throughout the saccade. If the target changes position during the saccade, the interruption of spatial continuity makes the target appear novel.

=== Stimulus properties ===
Properties of stimuli themselves have shown to have significant effects on the occurrence of chronostasis. In particular, the frequency and pattern of stimuli affect the observer's perception of chronostasis. In regard to frequency, the occurrence of many, similar events can exaggerate duration overestimation and makes the effects of chronostasis more severe. In regard to repetition, repetitive stimuli appear to be of shorter subjective duration than novel stimuli. This is due to neural suppression within the cortex. Investigation using various imaging techniques has shown that repetitive firing of the same cortical neurons cause them to be suppressed over time. This occurs as a form of neural adaptation.

=== Sensory domain ===
The occurrence of chronostasis extends beyond the visual domain into the auditory and tactile domains. In the auditory domain, chronostasis and duration overestimation occur when observing auditory stimuli. One common example is a frequent occurrence when making telephone calls. If, while listening to the phone's ring tone, research subjects move the phone from one ear to the other, the length of time between rings appears longer. In the tactile domain, chronostasis has persisted in research subjects as they reach for and grasp objects. After grasping a new object, subjects overestimate the time in which their hand has been in contact with this object. In other experiments, subjects turning a light on with a button were conditioned to experience the light before the button press. This suggests that, much in the same way subjects overestimate the duration of the second hand as they watch it, they may also overestimate the duration of auditory and tactile stimuli. This has led researchers to investigate the possibility that a common timing mechanism or temporal duration scheme is used for temporal perception of stimuli across a variety of sensory domains.

== See also ==
- Flash suppression – Phenomenon of visual perception
- Frame rate – Number of frames rendered in one second
- List of cognitive biases
- Kappa effect – Perceptual error in judging the time between stimuli
- Raster scan – Rectangular pattern of image capture and reconstruction
- Saccadic masking – Phenomenon in visual perception
- Saccadic suppression of image displacement – Visual perception phenomenon
- Time perception – Perception of events' position in time
- Transsaccadic memory
