= Opsoclonus =

- Other names: Saccadomania
- Specialty: Neurology

Opsoclonus refers to uncontrolled, irregular, and nonrhythmic eye movement. Opsoclonus consists of rapid, involuntary, multivectorial (horizontal and vertical), unpredictable, conjugate fast eye movements without inter-saccadic intervals. It is also referred to as saccadomania or reflexive saccade. The movements of opsoclonus may have a very small amplitude, appearing as tiny deviations from primary position.

Possible causes of opsoclonus include neuroblastoma and encephalitis in children, and breast, lung, or ovarian cancer in adults. Other considerations include GLUT1 Deficiency Syndrome, multiple sclerosis, toxins, medication effects (e.g. Serotonin Syndrome), celiac disease, certain infections (West Nile virus, Lyme disease), non-Hodgkin lymphoma, and renal adenocarcinoma. It can also be caused by a lesion in the omnipause neurons which tonically inhibit initiation of saccadic eye movement (until signaled by the superior colliculus) by blocking paramedian pontine reticular formation (PPRF) burst neurons in the pons. It frequently occurs along with myoclonus in opsoclonus myoclonus syndrome.

== See also ==
- Clonus
- Migraine
- Epilepsy
- Pathologic nystagmus
- Physiologic nystagmus
- Psychogenic non-epileptic seizures
- Ocular flutter
