= Infantile cerebellar retinal degeneration =

- Other names: Infantile cerebellar-retinal degeneration, ICRD
- Specialty: Medical genetics
- Symptoms: brain and ocular complications
- Complications: vision loss, intellectual disabilities
- Usual onset: age of 6 months old
- Duration: Life-long
- Causes: Autosomal-recessive genetic mutation
- Frequency: Rare, only 26 cases have been recorded in medical literature

Infantile cerebellar retinal degeneration is a rare hereditary neurological disorder which primarily affects the eyes and the brain.

== Presentation ==
Babies with this condition usually appear normal at birth, but start showing symptoms when they are just 6 months old, these symptoms are (but are not limited to): hypotonia, developmental delays, seizures, bobbing of the head, abnormal twitching and movement of the muscles, and loss of braincells from the cerebellum, retinal degeneration, involuntary rapid movement of the eyes, and strabismus.

== Causes ==
This condition is caused by mutations in the ACO2 gene, located on chromosome 22q13.2, these mutations are inherited in an autosomal recessive fashion, meaning that if both parents carry one copy of the disease-causing mutation, there is a 25% (1 in 4) chance their children will develop the disease.

Normally, this gene produces a protein/enzyme that catalyzes the interconversion of citrate to isocitrate via cis-aconitate in the second step of the TCA cycle.

== History ==
The first case report of this disorder was in 2012, when affected 8 members from 2 Arab-Muslim families, most of the patients were brought to the doctor when they were between 2 and 6 months of age, with most of the symptoms described before.

Since then, 6 more case reports (including more than one person) reporting new cases and/or studying the disease have been documented, leaving us with a total of 26 people with the disease recorded in global medical literature.
