= Frenzel goggles =

Medical diagnostic tool

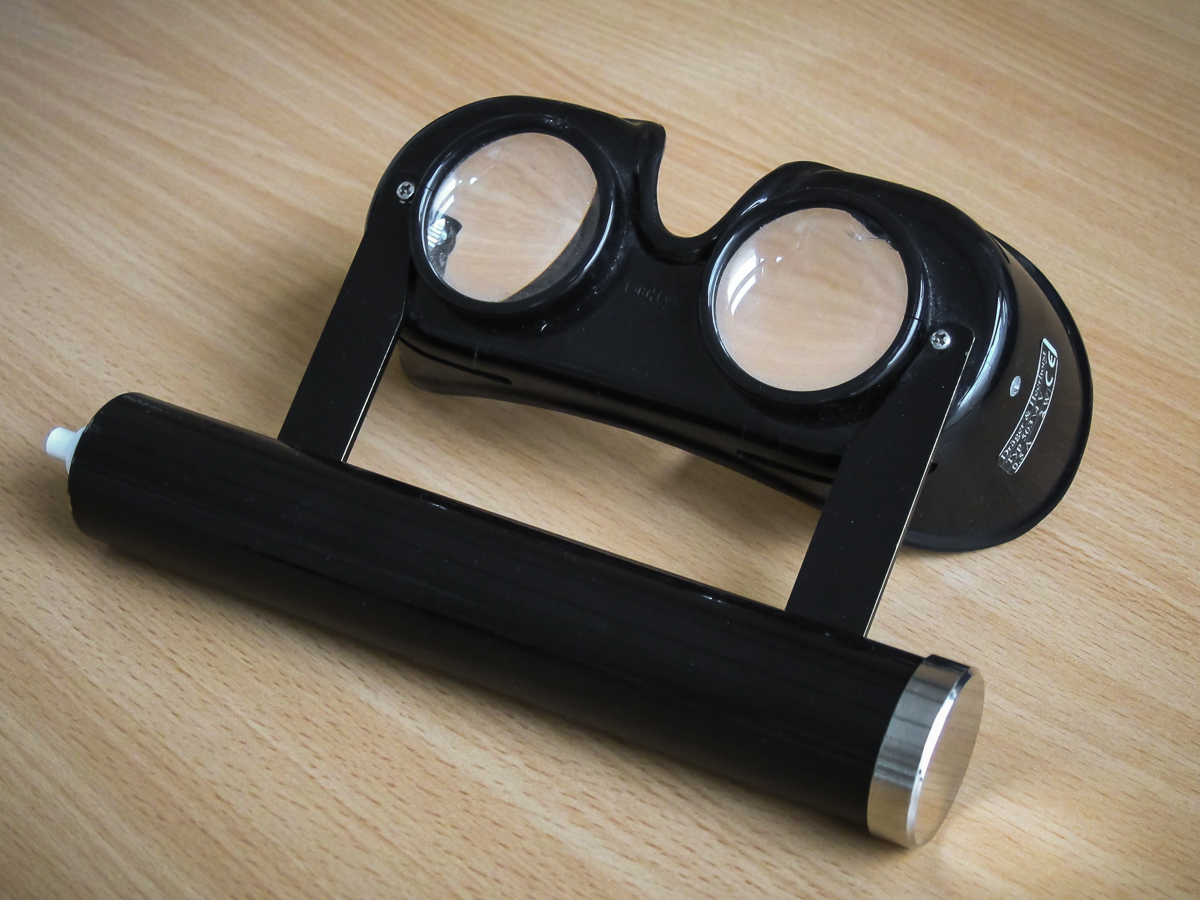
Frenzel goggles

Frenzel goggles are a diagnostic tool used in ophthalmology, otolaryngology and audiovestibular medicine for the medical evaluation of involuntary eye movement (nystagmus). They are named after Frenzel, a German physician.

== Usage ==
The purpose of the goggles is to disable the patient's ability to visually fixate on an object while at the same time allowing the examiner to adequately visualize the eye. This is done by using high-powered (+20 diopters) magnifying glasses with an illumination system. With such a high-powered lens, it is unlikely that the patient can adequately focus and visually fixate on an object to suppress nystagmus.
