= Saccadic masking =

Phenomenon in visual perception

Saccadic masking, also known as (visual) saccadic suppression, is the phenomenon in visual perception where the brain selectively blocks visual processing during eye movements in such a way that neither the motion of the eye (and subsequent motion blur of the image) nor the gap in visual perception is noticeable to the viewer.

The phenomenon was first described by Erdmann and Dodge in 1898, when it was noticed during unrelated experiments that an observer could never see the motion of their own eyes. This can easily be duplicated by looking into a mirror, and looking from one eye to another. The eyes can never be observed in motion, yet an external observer clearly sees the motion of the eyes.

The phenomenon is often used to help explain a temporal illusion by the name of chronostasis, which momentarily occurs following a rapid eye movement.

== Mechanism ==
A saccade is a fast eye motion, and because it is a motion that is optimised for speed, there is inevitable blurring of the image on the retina, as the retina is sweeping the visual field. Blurred retinal images are not of much use, and the eye has a mechanism that "cuts off" the processing of retinal images when it becomes blurred. This phenomenon is called saccadic masking or saccadic suppression. There were two major types of saccadic masking claimed: flash suppression (the inability to see a flash of light during a saccade) and saccadic suppression of image displacement (characterized by the inability to perceive whether a target has moved or not during a saccade). Testing since then has revealed that these two theories may not be correct. Within-saccade movement detection was proven and detailed in a paper by Richard Schweitzer and Martin Rolfs at Humboldt University in Berlin.

Because saccadic suppression starts before the actual onset of the saccade, it cannot be triggered by retinal motion and must be centrally activated by the brain. Supporting this idea, a significant reduction of the cortical signals retinotopically encoding stimuli briefly presented immediately before the execution of a saccade has been found as early as in primary visual cortex.

== Intrasaccadic perception: relationship with saccadic movements and motion blur ==
Saccadic masking is not fully related to the saccade itself. Saccadic masking starts with onset of the saccadic motion of the eye and the onset of the associated blur. Yet, it finishes as soon as the image on the retina has stabilized, whether due to finishing of the saccade itself or not. There are many ways in which the image on the retina during a saccade could be artificially stabilised to get rid of motion blur and thus finish the saccadic masking.

In the laboratory, this is typically studied by presenting a striped pattern that moves too fast to be seen, so that, when the eyes do not move, it appears as a homogeneous surface. But when the participant makes an eye movement in the same direction as the pattern movement, the velocity of the eye movement briefly matches that of the pattern movement. As a result, the pattern, which is normally invisible, briefly becomes stabilized on the retina, and consequently becomes visible. This phenomenon is known as intrasaccadic perception.

Outside of the laboratory, you can experience this as well, for example when riding on a train or on the lower deck of a bus. Assume one is looking straight out of the train car's window at the adjacent track. If the train is moving fast enough, the track one is seeing will be just a blur - the angular speed of the track's motion on the retina is too fast for the eye to compensate with optokinetic tracking. Then, one starts looking to the left and right along the track - just as if one was to catch something that was either speeding past on the track or lagging behind. Looking right and left along the adjacent track in fact means that one alternates the gaze between the left and right portions of the track. Changing the point of gaze is done as saccades. If, due to the car's motion, the track is 'escaping' to one's left, a left-going saccade will try to 'catch up' with the track's motion.

Saccadic velocity, plotted against time, is a bell-shaped curve. If the peak velocity of the saccade (height of the peak of the curve) is at least as large as the angular velocity of the adjacent track, there will be at least one point in which the velocity of the eye is the same as the velocity of the track. Imagine a bell shaped curve (velocity of the saccade) intersecting a horizontal line (constant velocity of the track). For a very short period of time (about a thousandth of a second), the eye follows the track closely enough. Thus, the image on the retina gets stable for a fraction of a second. As soon as the image is stable, there is no more blur, and the saccadic suppression switches off. This situation does not last long — since a saccade doesn't have a constant velocity, very soon the eye is moving either faster or slower than the track, and the blur reappears in a course of a millisecond. Yet, that millisecond (or so) is long enough for a snapshot of the retinal image to be stored, and to enable its further processing. In another quarter of a second, after the image has been processed by the brain, one actually 'sees' the freeze-frame image of the adjacent track—without any blur—to the extent that one easily notices details such as gravel, dirt in between the tracks, and so on.

A fragment of the possible timeline of the experiment follows. Although it is not known exactly how long a retinal image snapshot takes, it is assumed here that it is less than 10 ms.

Initially:	looking ahead on the adjacent track, the image on the retina moves with the tracks' angular velocity of 300 deg/s and is blurred
About T-0.1s:	decision to switch gaze ('look') to behind on the adjacent track
T+0.000s:	onset of the saccade: angular eye velocity starts rising from 0 deg/s, relative motion of track on the retina starts falling
T+0.199s:	angular eye velocity rises, and hits 300 deg/s -- that matches the track velocity; the track is resting relative to the retina—the blur ends
T+0.200s:	there is no blur on the retina, the saccadic masking is off, snapshot of the image starts to be taken
T+0.202s:	angular eye velocity is still rising, and exceeds the track velocity; the track starts moving on the retina—blur resumes
T+0.205s:	the snapshot starts being processed by the brain, retina 'sees' only the blur now
About T+.45s:	the image has been processed and one becomes aware of it: one sees the image; at this time the saccade could have already finished.

== See also ==
- List of cognitive biases
- Saccadic suppression of image displacement
- Transsaccadic memory
