= Motion blur =

Photography artifact from moving objects

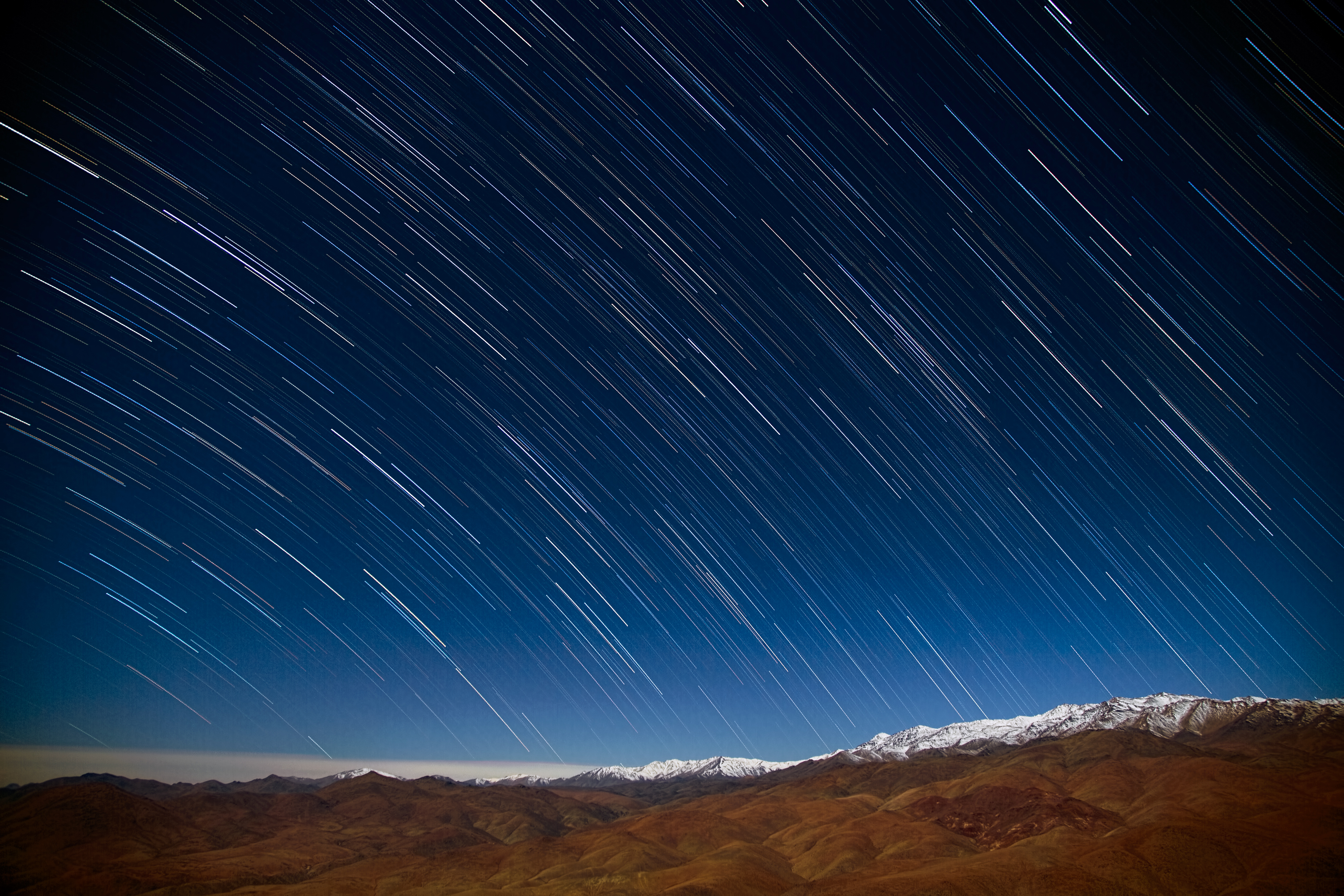
Earth's rotation causes motion blur in long-exposure photos of the night sky. This diurnal motion leaves star trails in exposures like this one taken at La Silla Observatory.

Motion blur is the apparent streaking of moving objects in a photograph or a sequence of frames, such as a film or animation. It results when the image being recorded changes during the recording of a single exposure, due to rapid movement or long exposure.

== Usages / Effects of motion blur ==
=== Photography ===
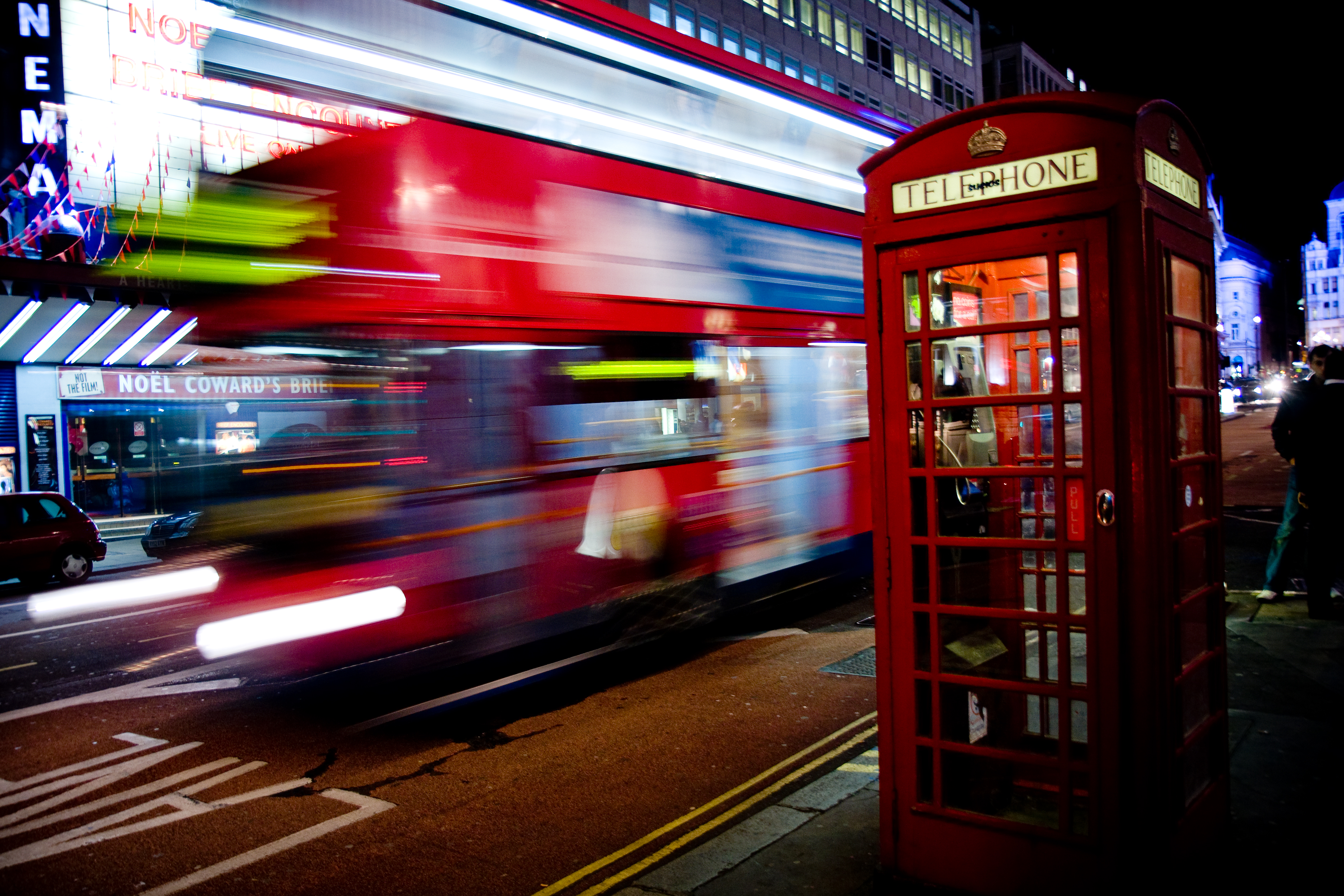
An example of motion blur showing a London bus passing a telephone box in London

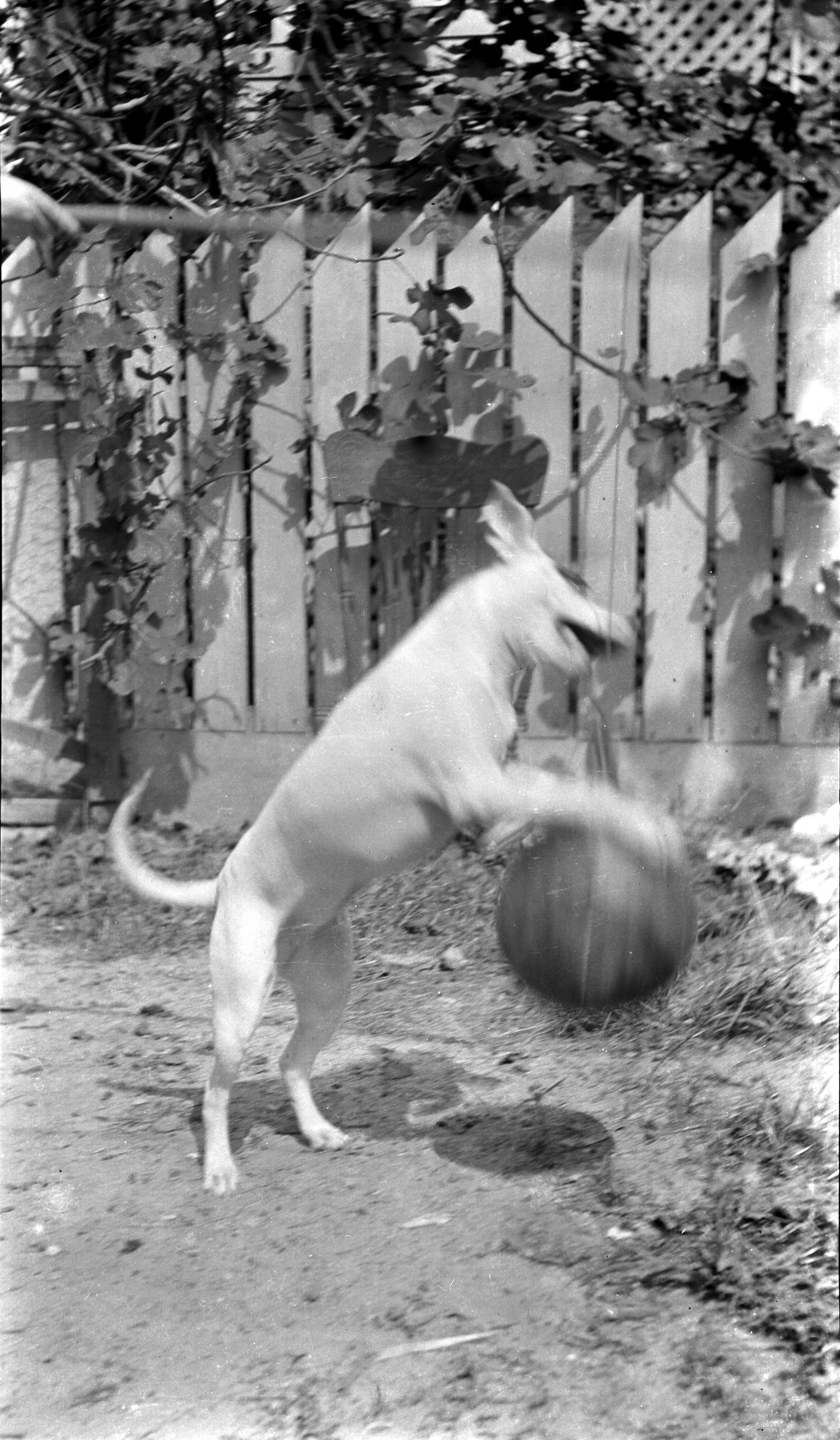
1920s example of motion blur

When a camera creates an image, that image does not represent a single instant of time. Because of technological constraints or artistic requirements, the image may represent the scene over a period of time. Most often this exposure time is brief enough that the image captured by the camera appears to capture an instantaneous moment, but this is not always so, and a fast moving object or a longer exposure time may result in blurring artifacts which make this apparent. As objects in a scene move, an image of that scene must represent an integration of all positions of those objects, as well as the camera's viewpoint, over the period of exposure determined by the shutter speed. In such an image, any object moving with respect to the camera will look blurred or smeared along the direction of relative motion. This smearing may occur on an object that is moving or on a static background if the camera is moving. In a film or television image, this looks natural because the human eye behaves in much the same way.

Because the effect is caused by the relative motion between the camera, and the objects and scene, motion blur may be manipulated by panning the camera to track those moving objects. In this case, even with long exposure times, the moving objects will appear sharper while the background will become more blurred, with the resulting image conveying a sense of movement and speed.

=== Animation ===
Two animations rotating around a figure, with motion blur (left) and without

In computer animation this effect must be simulated as a virtual camera actually does capture a discrete moment in time. This simulated motion blur is typically applied when either the camera or objects in the scene move rapidly.

Without this simulated effect each frame shows a perfect instant in time (analogous to a camera with an infinitely fast shutter), with zero motion blur. This is why a video game with a frame rate of 25–30 frames per second will seem staggered, while natural motion filmed at the same frame rate appears rather more continuous. Many modern video games feature motion blur, especially vehicle simulation games.

Some of the better-known games that use this are the recent Need for Speed titles and Unreal Tournament III, among many others. There are two main methods used in video games to achieve motion blur: cheaper full-screen effects, which typically only take camera movement (and sometimes how fast the camera is moving in 3D space to create a radial blur) into mind, and more "selective" or "per-object" motion blur, which typically uses a shader to create a velocity buffer to mark motion intensity for a motion blurring effect to be applied to or uses a shader to perform geometry extrusion. Classic motion blur effects prior to modern per-pixel shading pipelines often simply drew successive frames on top of each other with slight transparency, which is strictly speaking a form of video feedback.

In pre-rendered computer animation, such as CGI movies, realistic motion blur can be drawn because the renderer has more time to draw each frame. Temporal anti-aliasing produces frames as a composite of many instants. Frames are not points in time, they are periods of time. If an object makes a trip at a linear speed along a path from 0% to 100% in four time periods, and if those time periods are considered frames, then the object would exhibit motion blur streaks in each frame that are 25% of the path length. If the shutter speed is shortened to less than the duration of a frame, and it may be so shortened as to approach zero time in duration, then the computer animator must choose which portion of the quarter paths (in our 4 frame example) they wish to feature as "open shutter" times. They may choose to render the beginnings of each frame, in which case they will never see the arrival of the object at the end of the path, or they may choose to render the ends of each frame, in which case they will miss the starting point of the trip. Most computer animation systems make the classic "fence-post error" in the way they handle time, confusing the periods of time of an animation with the instantaneous moments that delimit them. Thus most computer animation systems will incorrectly place an object on a four frame trip along a path at 0%, 0.33%, 0.66%, and 1.0% and when called upon to render motion blur will have to cut one or more frames short, or look beyond the boundaries of the animation, compromises that real cameras don't do and synthetic cameras needn't do.

Motion lines in cel animation are drawn in the same direction as motion blur and perform much the same duty. Go motion is a variant of stop motion animation that moves the models during the exposure to create a less staggered effect.

=== Computer graphics ===
In 2D computer graphics, motion blur is an artistic filter that converts the digital image/bitmap/raster image in order to simulate the effect. Many graphical software products (e.g. Adobe Photoshop or GIMP) offer simple motion blur filters. However, for advanced motion blur filtering including curves or non-uniform speed adjustment, specialized software products (e.g. VirtualRig Studio) are necessary.

=== Physiology ===
When an animal's eye is in motion, the image will suffer from motion blur, resulting in an inability to resolve details. To cope with this, humans generally alternate between saccades (quick eye movements) and fixation (focusing on a single point). Saccadic masking makes motion blur during a saccade invisible. Similarly, smooth pursuit allows the eye to track a target in rapid motion, eliminating motion blur of that target instead of the scene.

If their velocity exceeds the temporal resolution of the visual system, moving figures will be rendered with smeared contours or as a streaks that average the received light across its path. The effect is more obvious with luminous objects moving through darkness, due to the relative sluggish processing by rod cells that dominate scotopic vision.

== Negative effects of motion blur ==
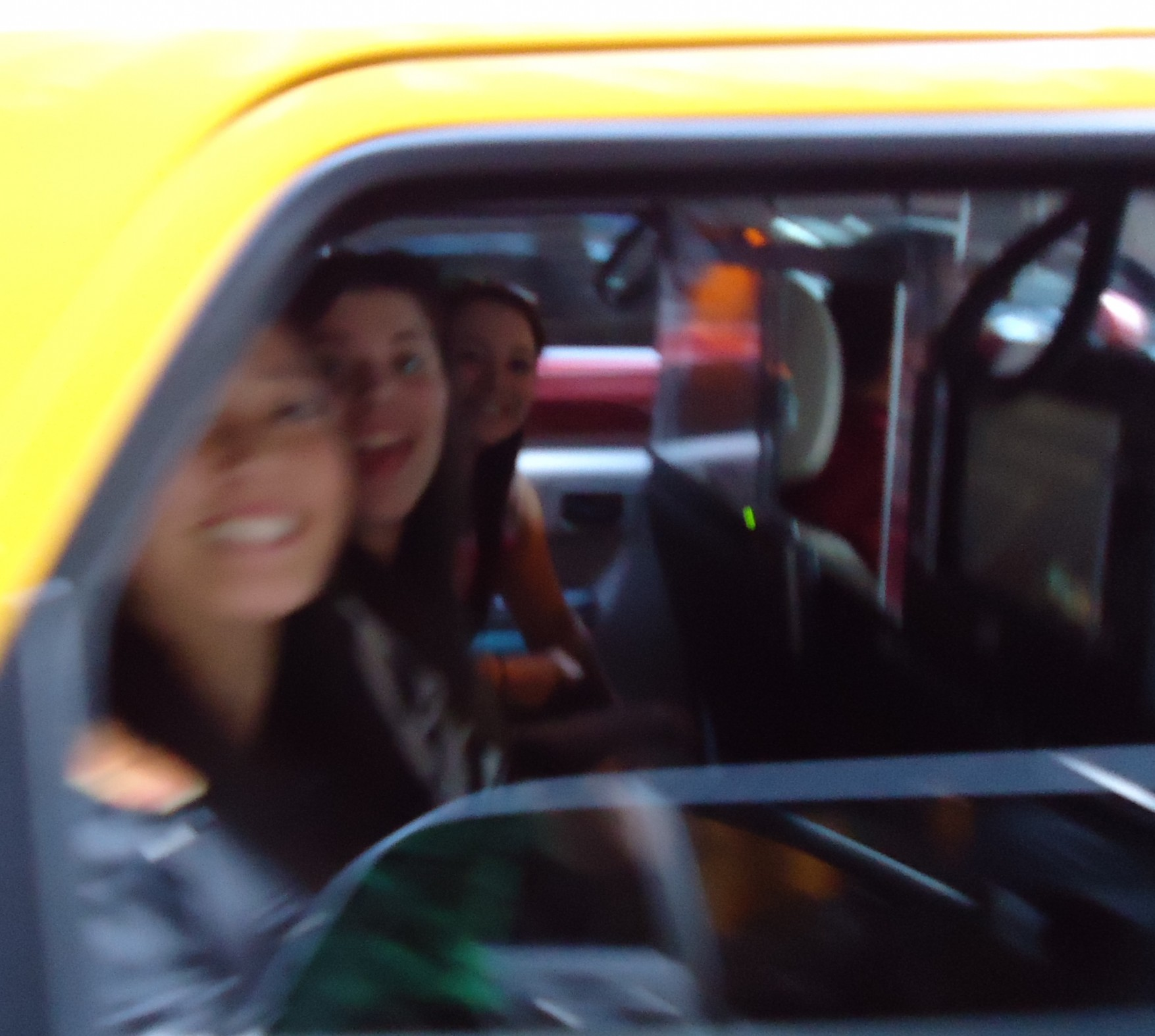
A taxicab starting to drive off blurred the girls' faces in the image.

=== Television ===
In televised sports, where conventional cameras expose pictures 25 or 30 times per second, motion blur can be inconvenient because it obscures the exact position of a projectile or athlete in slow motion. For this reason special cameras are often used which eliminate motion blurring by taking rapid exposures on the order of 1 millisecond, and then transmitting them over the course of the next 30 to 40 milliseconds. Although this gives sharper slow motion replays, it can look strange at normal speeds because the eye expects to see motion blurring and is not provided with blurred images.

Conversely, extra motion blur can unavoidably occur on displays when it is not desired. This occurs with some video displays (especially LCD) that exhibits motion blur during fast motion. This can lead to more perceived motion blurring above and beyond the preexisting motion blur in the video material. See display motion blur.

Sometimes, motion blur can be removed from images with the help of deconvolution.

=== Video games ===
In video games the use or not of motion blur is somewhat controversial. Some players claim that the blur actually makes the game worse, as it does blur images, making it more difficult to recognize objects (especially so in fast-paced moments). This does become more noticeable (and more problematic) with a reduction in framerate. Improvements in the visual quality of modern post-process motion blur shaders as well as a tendency towards higher framerates have lessened the visual detriment of undersampled motion blur effects.

=== Wind turbines ===
Birds cannot properly see the swirling blades of wind turbines and can get struck by them fatally. A 2020 report from Norway suggests that painting one of the three blades with a black tip makes the blades more visible and hence more avoidable. This reduces the motion blur of the unpainted blades, and cuts bird deaths by up to 70 percent.

=== Aerial mapping/surveying ===
During aerial mapping an aircraft or drone is used to take pictures of the ground during flight. If the flight speed is too high or if shutter speeds are too long, this can lead to motion blur. Motion blur reduces the quality of the images and has a negative effect on the mapping products. Motion blur can be avoided by adjusting the flight altitude, flight velocity, or shutter speed.

== Restoration ==
An example of blurred image restoration with Wiener deconvolution:

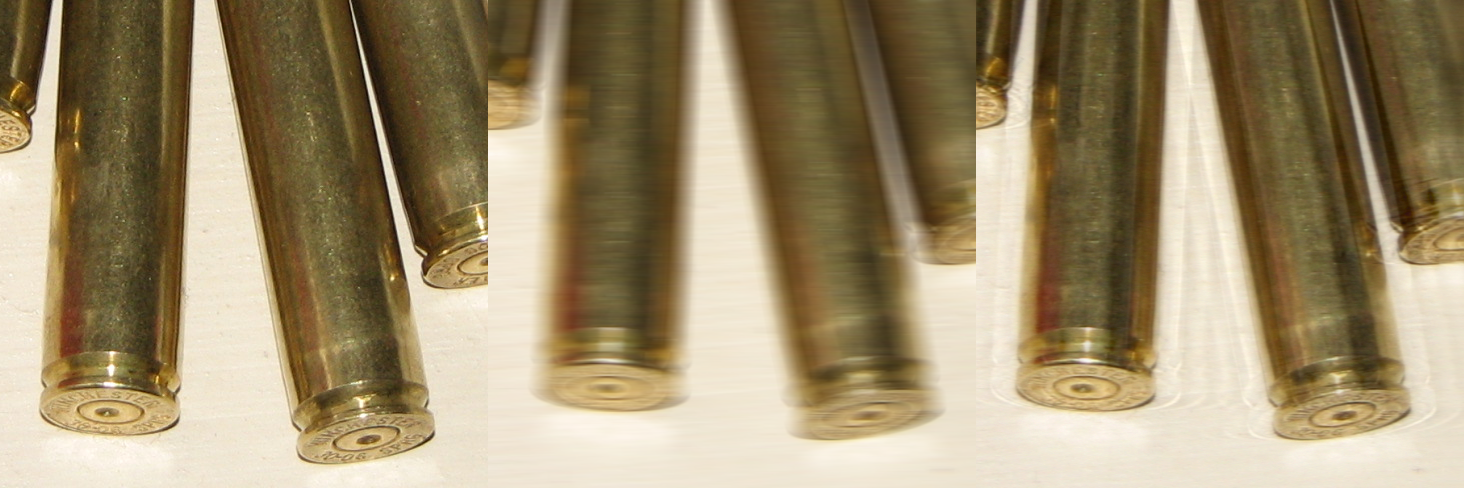
From left: original image, blurred image and de-blurred image. Notice some artifacts in the de-blurred image.

== Gallery ==
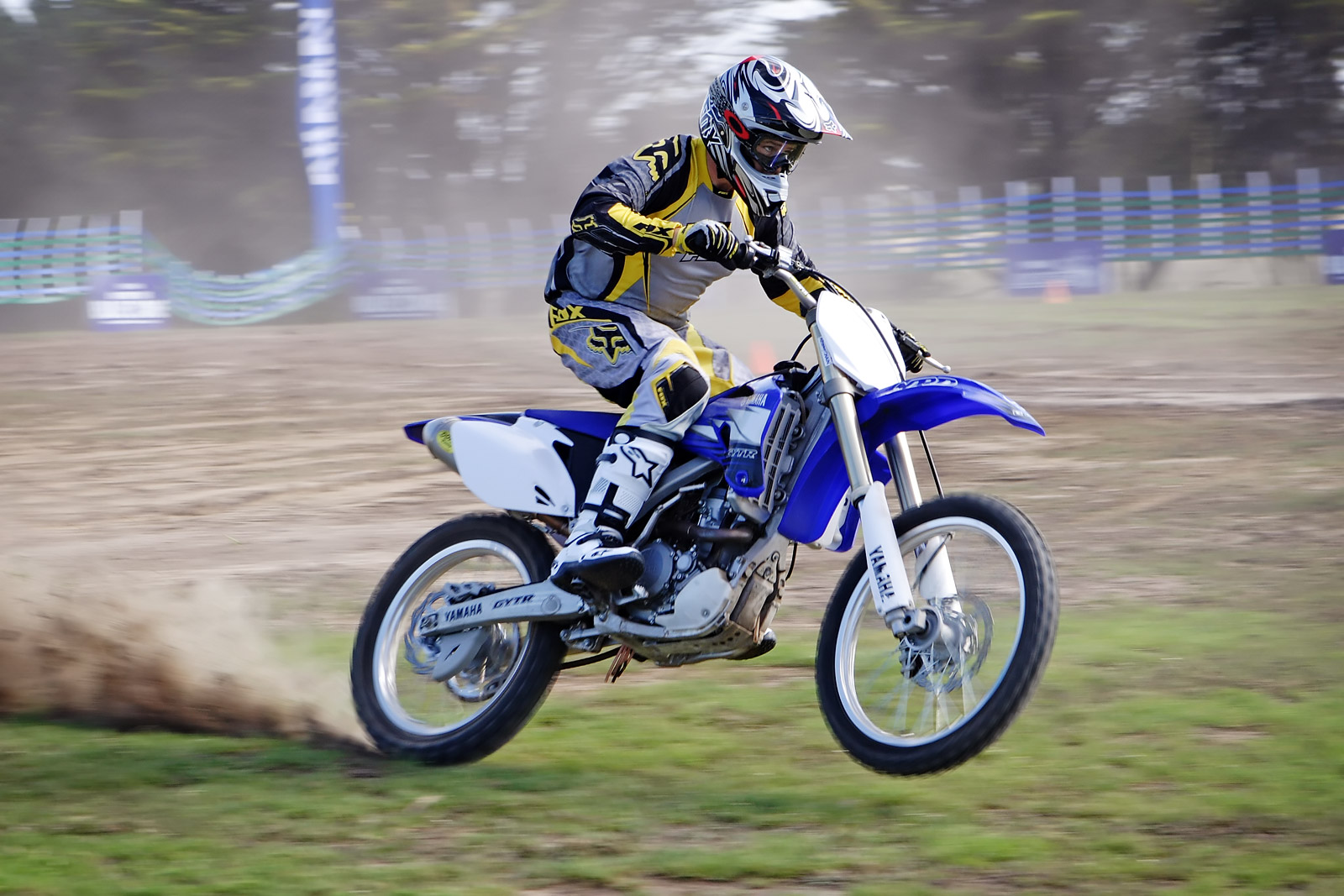
Motion blur is frequently employed in sports photography (particularly motorsports) to convey a sense of speed. To achieve this effect it is necessary to use a slow shutter speed and pan the lens of the camera in time with the motion of the object.

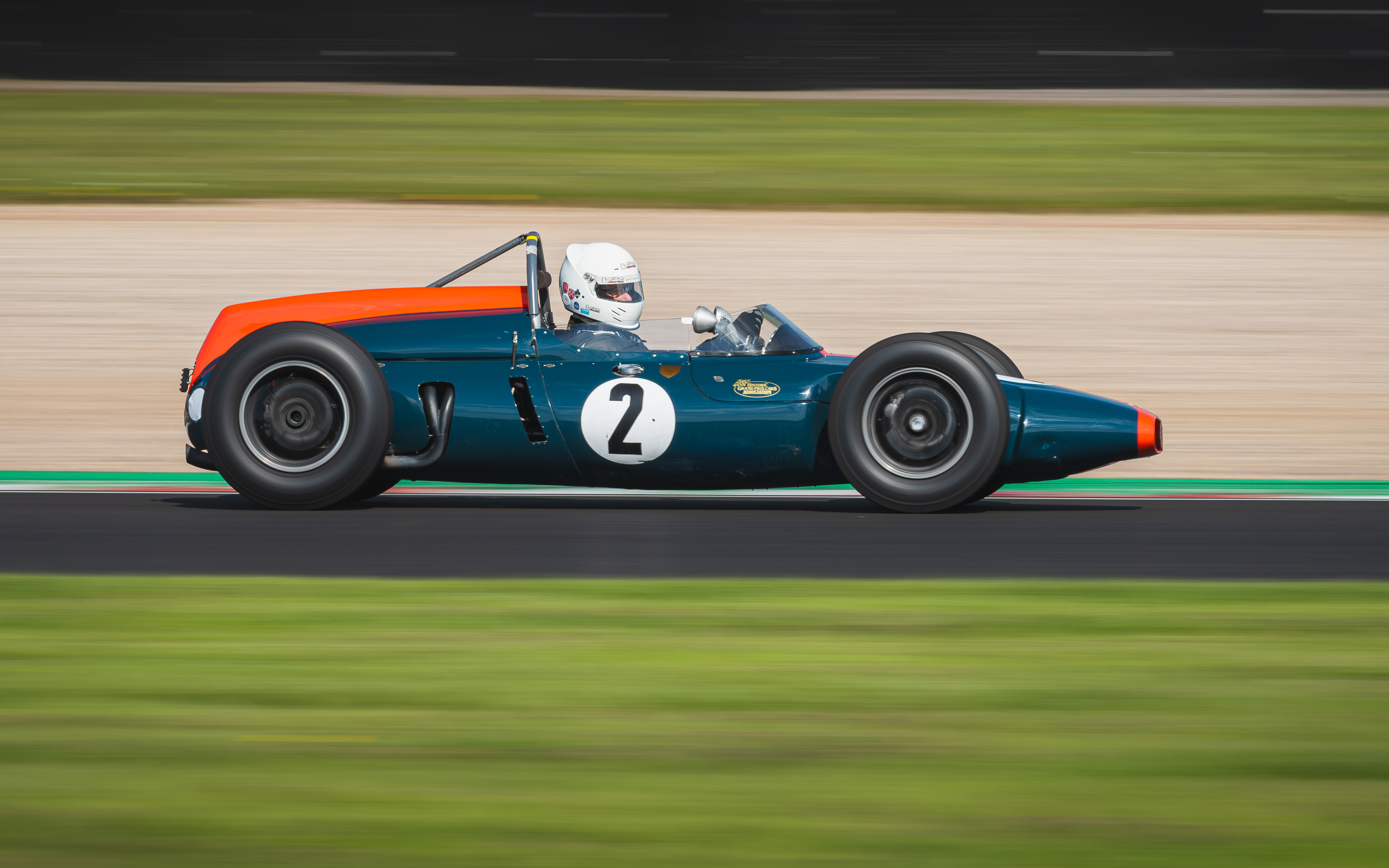
Another example of a photo where the camera is panned at the same speed as the racing car

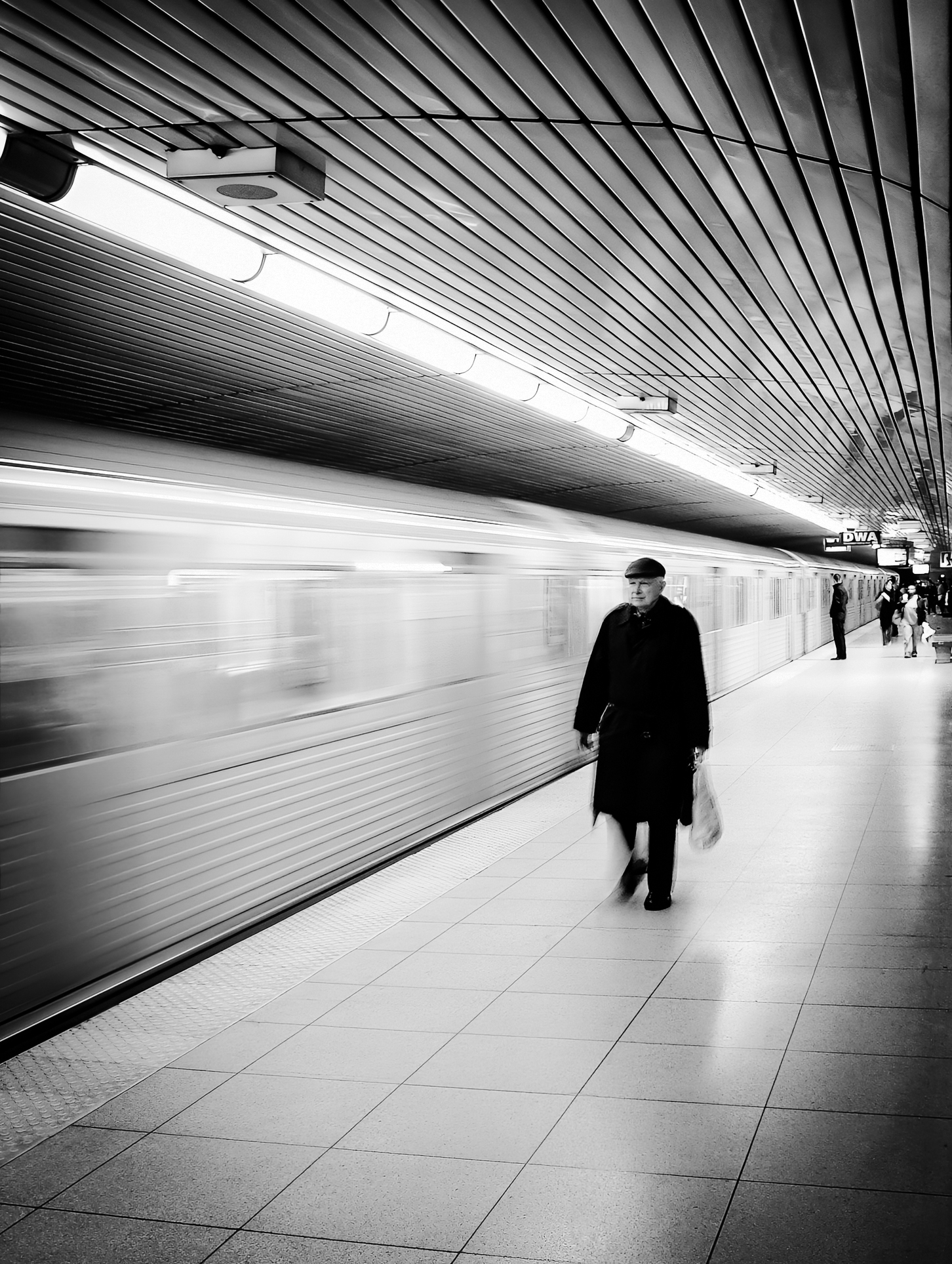
A man on the platform at Dundas subway station in Toronto, with a moving train blurred in the background

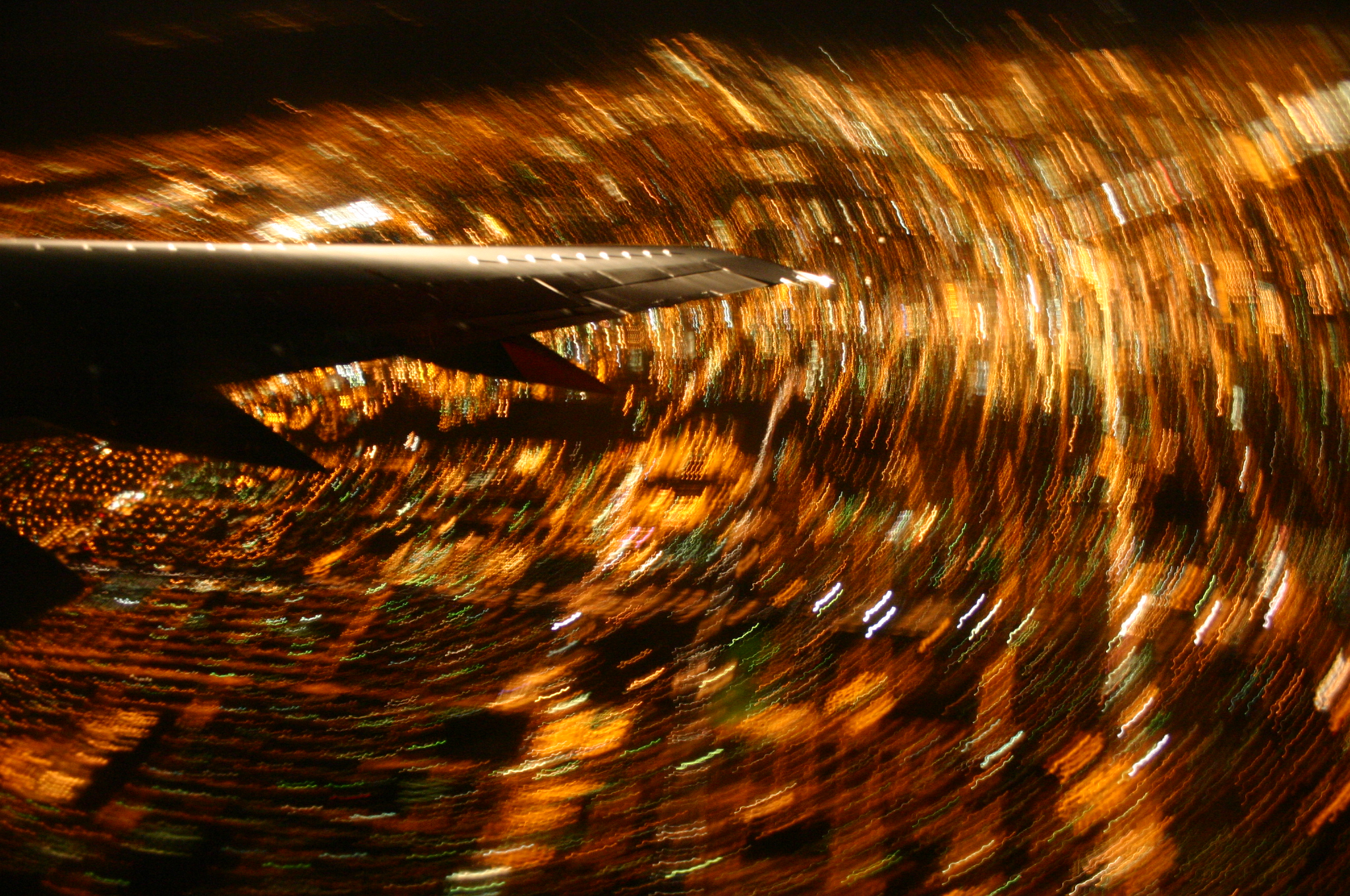
Taken aboard an airplane turning above San Jose at night. The city lights form concentric strips.

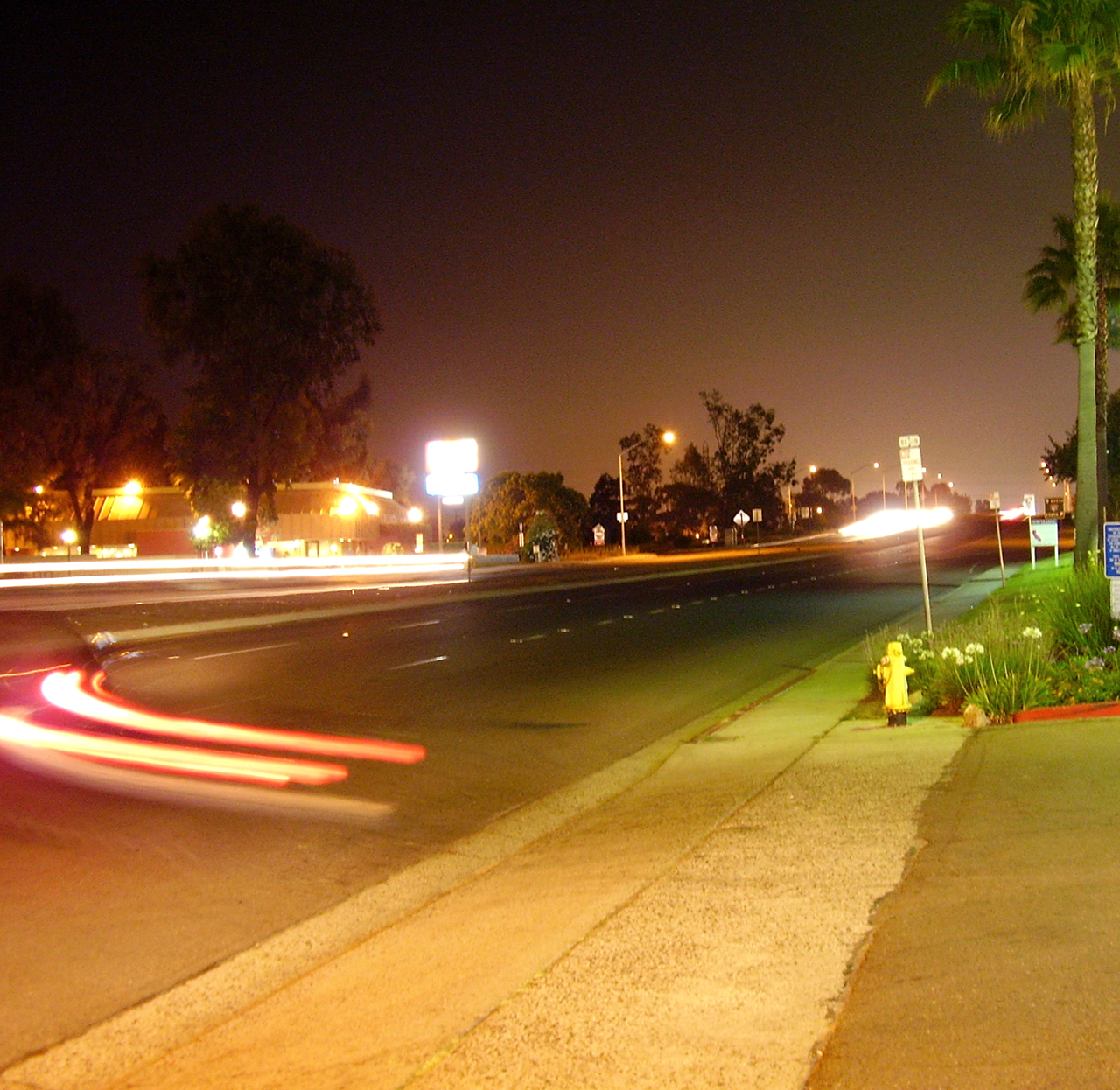
The traffic on this street leaves brilliant streaks due to the low shutter speed of the camera and the cars' relatively fast speed.

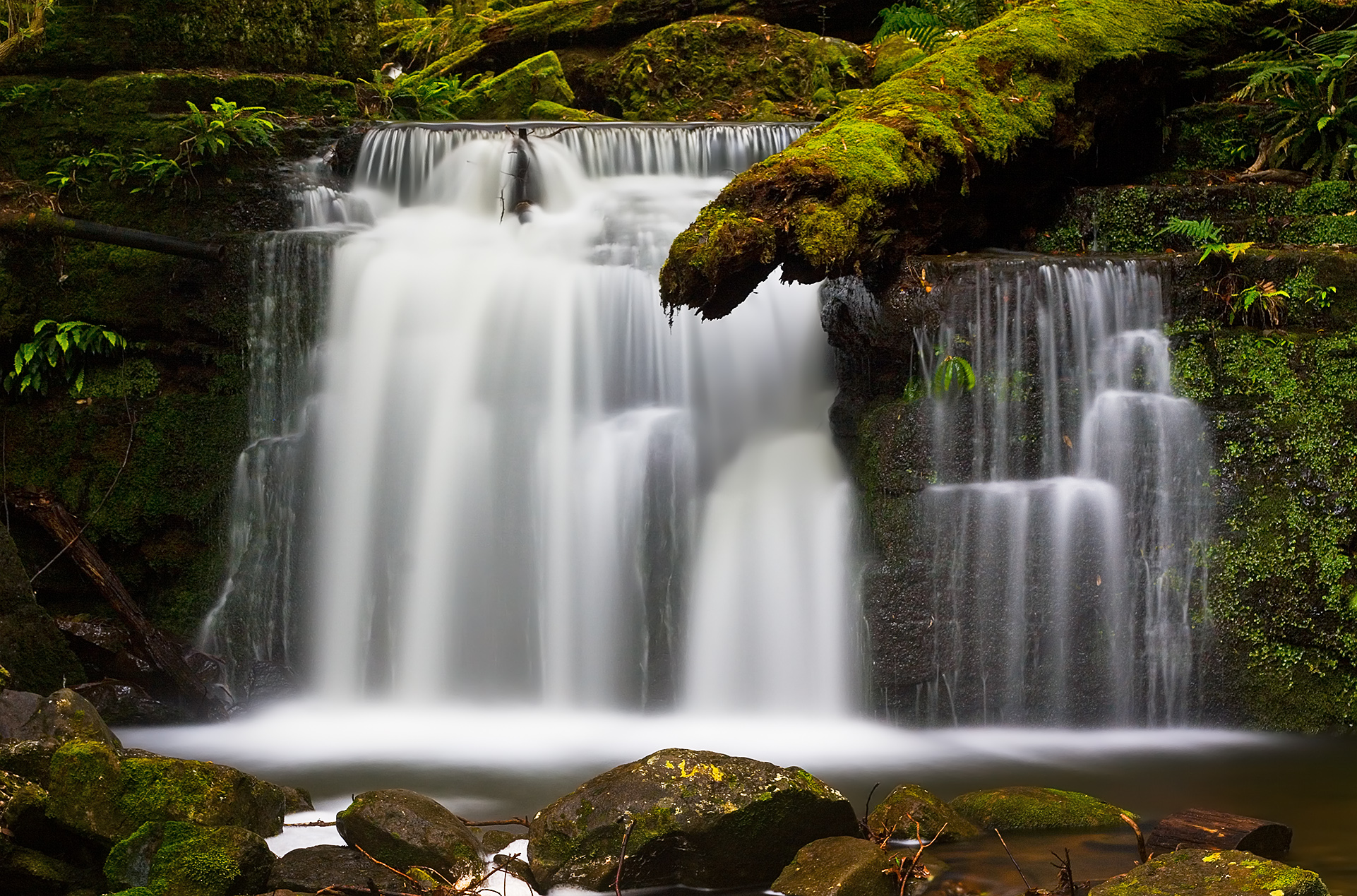
Strickland Falls in Tasmania, Australia, photographed with a neutral density filter. ND filters reduce light evenly across the spectrum, allowing a larger aperture and slower shutter speed without overexposure, creating the motion blur effect.

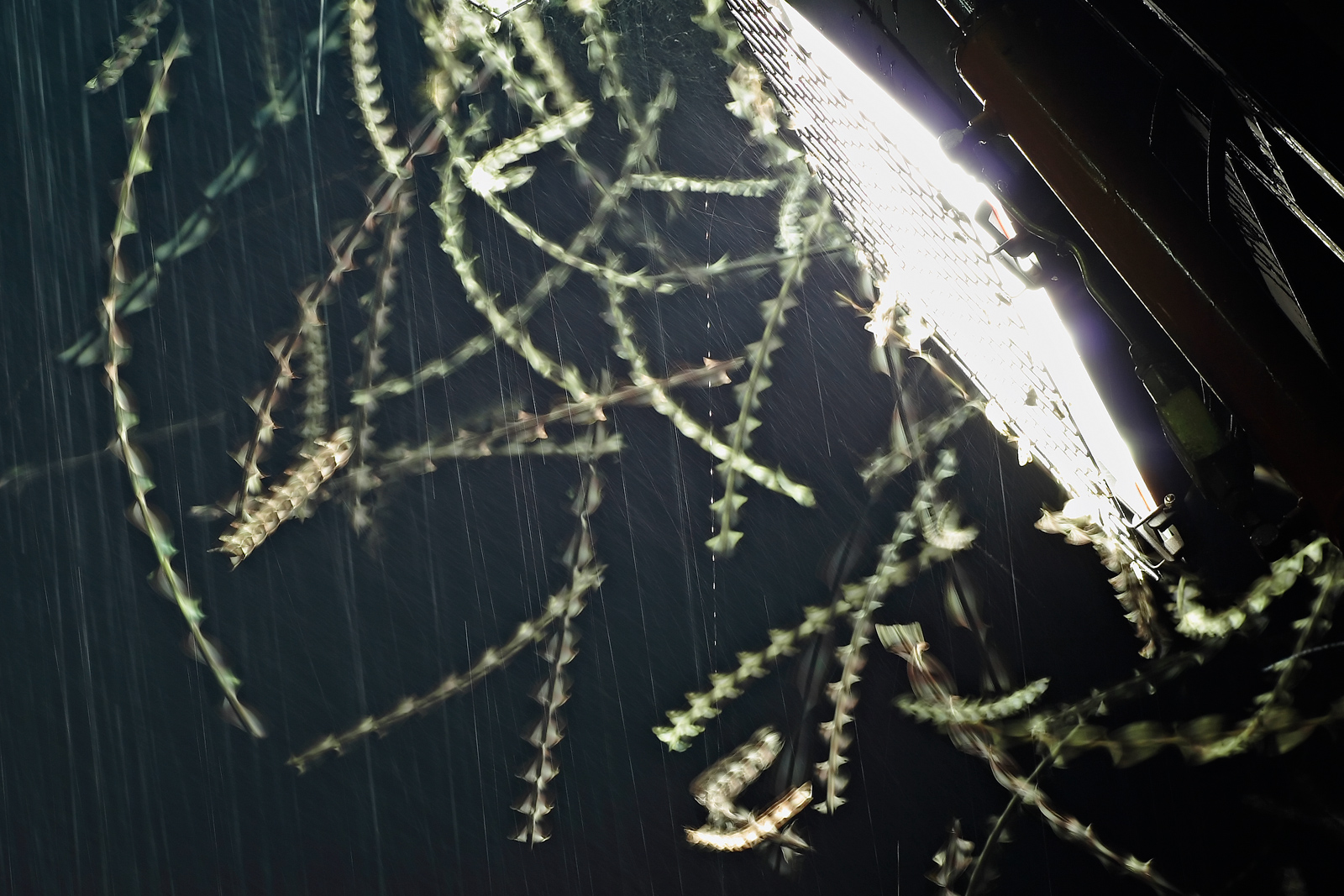
Long exposure photograph of moths showing exaggerated rod effect

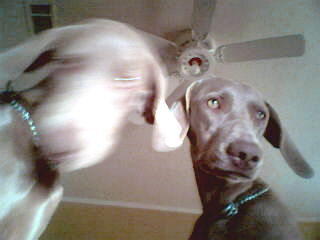
Mammals are especially prone to motion blur as some can reach high speeds of movement

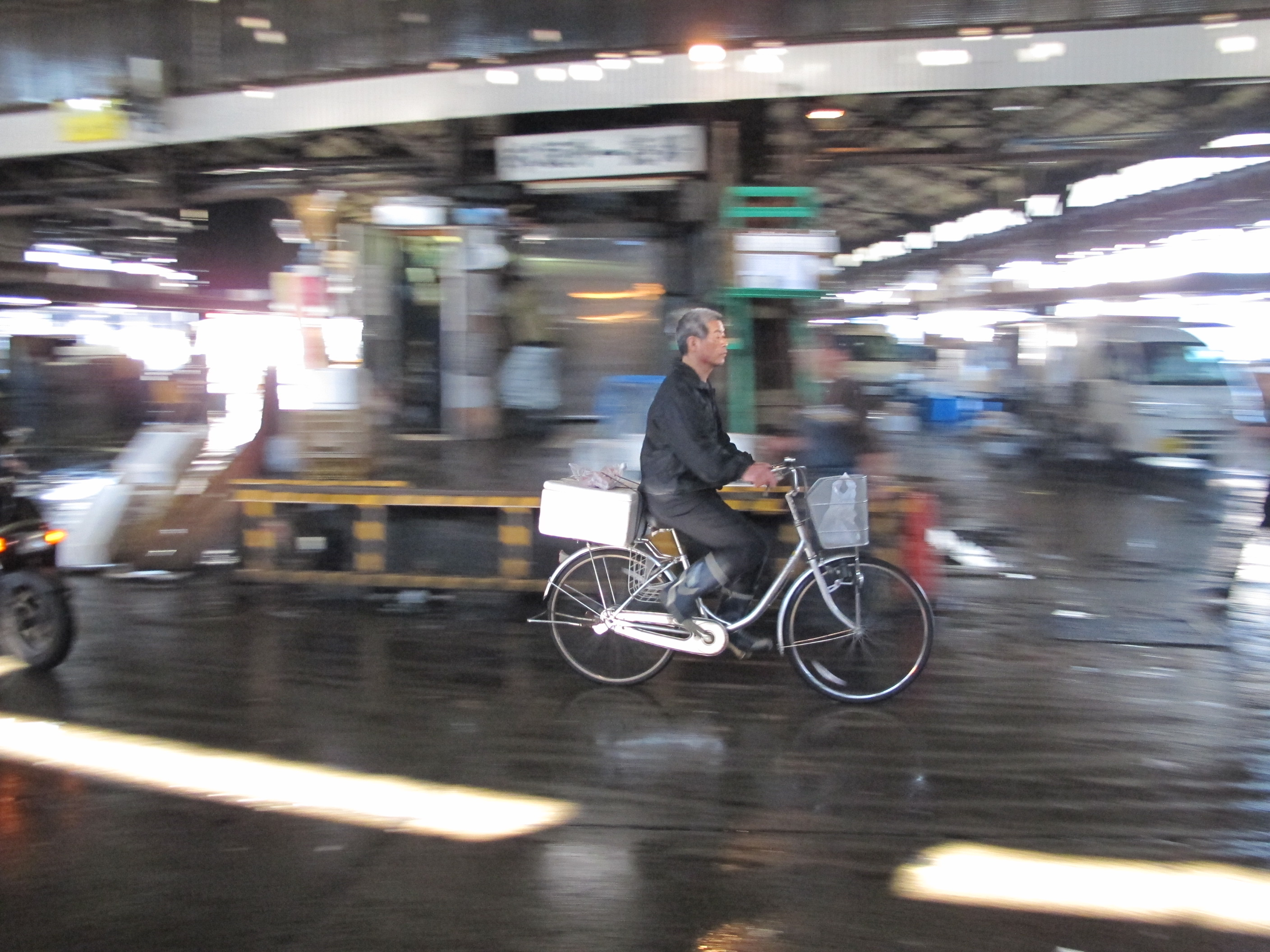
Motion blur is evident in this photo of a worker at the former Tsukiji fish market in Tokyo

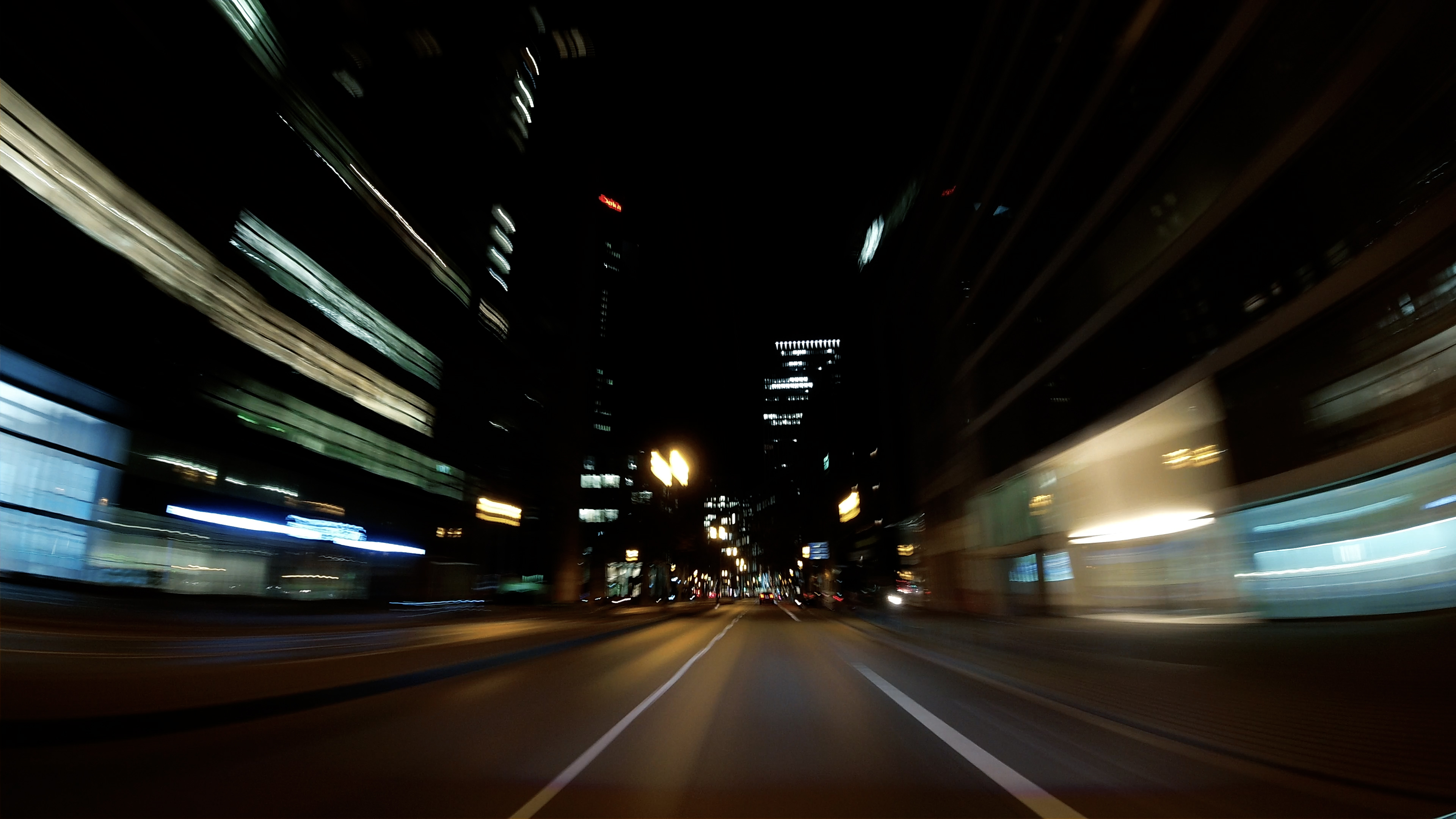
Motion blur example while driving

== See also ==
- Motion lines, a technique found in comics which conveys a sense of motion
- Rolling shutter effect
- Smear frame
