= Saccade =

Eye movement

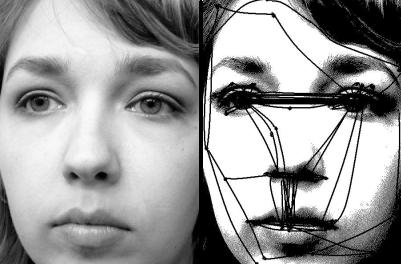
Trace of saccades of the human eye on a face while scanning

Saccades during observation of a picture on a computer screen

In vision science, a saccade (/səˈkɑːd/ sə-KAHD; French: [sakad]; French for 'jerk') is a quick, simultaneous movement of both eyes between two or more phases of focal points in the same direction. In contrast, in smooth-pursuit movements, the eyes move smoothly instead of in jumps. Controlled cortically by the frontal eye fields (FEF), or subcortically by the superior colliculus, saccades serve as a mechanism for focal points, rapid eye movement, and the fast phase of optokinetic nystagmus. The word appears to have been coined in the 1870s by the French ophthalmologist Émile Javal, who used a mirror on one side of a page to observe eye movement in silent reading and found that it involves a succession of discontinuous individual movements. These movements quickly scan objects of attention and aid the brain in grasping a scene visually.

== Function ==
Humans and many organisms do not look at a scene in steadiness; instead, the eyes move around, locating interesting parts of the scene and building up a three-dimensional 'map' corresponding to the scene (as opposed to the graphical map of avians, which often relies upon detection of angular movement on the retina).

When scanning immediate surroundings or reading, human eyes make saccadic movements and stop several times, moving very quickly between each stop. The speed of movement during each saccade cannot be controlled; the eyes move as fast as they are able. One reason for the saccadic movement of the human eye is that the central part of the retina—known as the fovea—which provides the high-resolution portion of vision is very small in humans, only about 1–2 degrees of vision, but it plays a critical role in resolving objects. Saccades allow the eyes to sense small parts of a scene with greater resolution and thereby allow the brain to assemble these parts into a coherent, continuous mental representation.

== Timing and kinematics ==
Saccades are one of the fastest movements produced by the human eye (blinks may reach even higher peak velocities). The peak angular speed of the eye during a saccade reaches up to 700°/s in humans for great saccades (25° of visual angle); in some monkeys, peak speed can reach 1000°/s. Saccades to an unexpected stimulus normally take about 200 milliseconds (ms) to initiate, and then last from about 20–200 ms, depending on their amplitude (20–30 ms is typical in language reading). Under certain laboratory circumstances, the latency of, or reaction time to, saccade production can be cut nearly in half (express saccades). These saccades are generated by a neuronal mechanism that bypasses time-consuming circuits and activates the eye muscles more directly. Specific pre-target oscillatory (alpha rhythms) and transient activities occurring in posterior-lateral parietal cortex and occipital cortex also characterize express saccades.

To achieve such high speeds, there are specialized oculomotor burst neurons in the brainstem that wire into the ocular motor neuron. The burst neurons implement bang-bang control: they are either completely inhibited, or firing at its full rate of ~1000 Hz. Since the motion of the eye is essentially a linear system, bang-bang control minimizes travel time. After a saccade, a constant force is required to hold the position against elastic force, thus resulting in a pulse-step control.

Saccadic main sequence, showing single saccades from a participant performing a visually-guided saccade task. It is called "main sequence" because it looks like the main sequence in astrophysics.

The amplitude of a saccade is the angular distance the eye travels during the movement. For amplitudes up to 15 or 20°, the velocity of a saccade linearly depends on the amplitude (the so-called saccadic main sequence, a term borrowed from astrophysics; see Figure). For amplitudes larger than 20°, the peak velocity starts to plateau (nonlinearly) toward the maximum velocity attainable by the eye at around 60°. For instance, a 10° amplitude is associated with a velocity of 300°/s, and 30° is associated with 500°/s. Therefore, for larger amplitude ranges, the main sequence can best be modeled by an inverse power law function.

The high peak velocities and the main sequence relationship can also be used to distinguish micro-/saccades from other eye movements (like ocular tremor, ocular drift, and smooth pursuit). Velocity-based algorithms are a common approach for saccade detection in eye tracking. Although, depending on the demands on timing accuracy, acceleration-based methods are more precise.

Saccades may rotate the eyes in any direction to relocate gaze direction (the direction of sight that corresponds to the fovea), but normally saccades do not rotate the eyes torsionally. (Torsion is clockwise or counterclockwise rotation around the line of sight when the eye is at its central primary position; defined this way, Listing's law says that, when the head is motionless, torsion is kept at zero.)

Head-fixed saccades can have amplitudes of up to 90° (from one edge of the oculomotor range to the other), but in normal conditions saccades are far smaller, and any shift of gaze larger than about 20° is accompanied by a head movement. During such gaze saccades, first, the eye produces a saccade to get gaze on target, whereas the head follows more slowly and the vestibulo-ocular reflex (VOR) causes the eyes to roll back in the head to keep gaze on the target. Since the VOR can actually rotate the eyes around the line of sight, combined eye and head movements do not always obey Listing's law.

The rotational inertia of the eye is negligible compared to the elastic and viscous force.

== Types ==
Saccades can be categorized by intended goal in four ways:

1. In a visually guided saccade, the eyes move toward a visual transient, or stimulus. The parameters of visually guided saccades (amplitude, latency, peak velocity, and duration) are frequently measured as a baseline when measuring other types of saccades. Visually guided saccades can be further subcategorized:
  - A reflexive saccade is triggered exogenously by the appearance of a peripheral stimulus, or by the disappearance of a fixation stimulus.
  - A scanning saccade is triggered endogenously for the purpose of exploring the visual environment.
2. In an antisaccade, the eyes move away from the visual onset. They are more delayed than visually guided saccades, and observers often make erroneous saccades in the wrong direction. A successful antisaccade requires inhibiting a reflexive saccade to the onset location, and voluntarily moving the eye in the other direction.
3. In a memory guided saccade, the eyes move toward a remembered point, with no visual stimulus.
4. In a sequence of predictive saccades, the eyes are kept on an object moving in a temporally and/or spatially predictive manner. In this instance, saccades often coincide with (or anticipate) the predictable movement of an object.

As referenced to above, it is also useful to categorize saccades by latency (time between go-signal and movement onset). In this case the categorization is binary: Either a given saccade is an express saccade or it is not. The latency cut-off is approximately ~200 ms; any longer than this is outside the express saccade range.

Microsaccades are a related type of fixational eye movement that are small, jerk-like, involuntary eye movements, similar to miniature versions of voluntary saccades. They typically occur during visual fixation, not only in humans, but also in other animals with foveal vision, such as haplorhine primates in general and hawks. Microsaccade amplitudes vary from 2 to 120 arcminutes.

== In depth ==
When exploring the visual environment with the gaze, humans make two to three fixations a second. Each fixation involves binocularly coordinated movements of the eyes to acquire the new target in three dimensions: horizontal and vertical, but also in-depth. In literature it has been shown how an upward or a vertical saccade is generally accompanied by a divergence of the eyes, while a downward saccade is accompanied by a convergence. The amount of this intra-saccadic vergence has a strong functional significance for the effectiveness of binocular vision. When making an upward saccade, the eyes diverged to be aligned with the most probable uncrossed disparity in that part of the visual field. On the other way around, when making a downward saccade, the eyes converged to enable alignment with crossed disparity in that part of the field. The phenomenon can be interpreted as an adaptation of rapid binocular eye movements to the statistics of the 3D environment, in order to minimize the need for corrective vergence movements at the end of saccades.

== Pathophysiologic saccades ==
Saccadic oscillations not fitting the normal function are a deviation from a healthy or normal condition. Nystagmus is characterized by the combination of 'slow phases', which usually take the eye off the point of regard, interspersed with saccade-like "quick phases" that serve to bring the eye back on target. Pathological slow phases may be due to either an imbalance in the vestibular system or damage to the brainstem "neural integrator" that normally holds the eyes in place. On the other hand, opsoclonus or ocular flutter are composed purely of fast-phase saccadic eye movements. Without the use of objective recording techniques, it may be very difficult to distinguish between these conditions.

Eye movement measurements are also used to investigate psychiatric disorders. For example, ADHD is characterized by an increase of antisaccade errors and an increase in delays for visually guided saccade. Various pathological conditions also alter microsaccades and other fixational eye movements.

Paroxysmal eye–head movements, termed aberrant gaze saccades, are an early symptom of GLUT1 deficiency syndrome in infancy.

== Saccade adaptation ==
When the brain is led to believe that the saccades it is generating are too large or too small (by an experimental manipulation in which a saccade-target steps backward or forward contingent on the eye movement made to acquire it), saccade amplitude gradually decreases (or increases), an adaptation (also termed gain adaptation) widely seen as a simple form of motor learning, possibly driven by an effort to correct visual error.

This effect was first observed in humans with ocular muscle palsy. In these cases, it was noticed that the patients would make hypometric (small) saccades with the affected eye, and that they were able to correct these errors over time. This led to the realization that visual or retinal error (the difference between the post-saccadic point of regard and the target position) played a role in the homeostatic regulation of saccade amplitude. Since then, much scientific research has been devoted to various experiments employing saccade adaptation.

== Reading ==
Saccadic eye movement allows the mind to read quickly, but it comes with its disadvantages. It can cause the mind to skip over words because it does not see them as important to the sentence, and the mind completely leaves it from the sentence or it replaces it with the wrong word. This can be seen in "Paris in the the Spring". This is a common psychological test, where the mind will often skip the second "the", especially when there is a line break in between the two.

When speaking, the mind plans what will be said before it is said. Sometimes the mind is not able to plan in advance and the speech is rushed out. This is why there are errors like mispronunciation, stuttering, and unplanned pauses. The same thing happens when reading. The mind does not always know what will come next. This is another reason that the second "the" can be missed.

== Vision ==
=== Saccadic masking ===
During a saccade, low spatial frequencies (the 'fuzzier' parts) are attenuated whereas higher spatial frequencies (an image's fine details) that would otherwise be blurred by the eye movement remain unaffected. The attenuation, known as saccadic masking or saccadic suppression, is known to begin prior to saccadic eye movements in every primate species studied, implying neurological reasons for the effect rather than simply the image's motion blur. This phenomenon leads to the so-called stopped-clock illusion, or chronostasis.

A person may observe the saccadic masking effect by standing in front of a mirror and looking from one eye to the next (and vice versa). The subject will not experience any movement of the eyes or any evidence that the optic nerve has momentarily ceased transmitting. Through saccadic masking, the eye/brain system not only hides the eye movements from the individual but also hides the evidence that anything has been hidden. Of course, a second observer watching the experiment will see the subject's eyes moving back and forth. The function's main purpose is to prevent an otherwise significant smearing of the image. (One can experience one's eye saccade movements by using a cellphone's front-facing camera as a delayed mirror; if the screen is held a couple of inches away as the viewer looks from one eye to the other, the signal-processing delay allows them to see the end of their own saccade movement.)

=== Spatial updating ===
When a visual stimulus is seen before a saccade, subjects are still able to make another saccade back to that image, even if it is no longer visible. This shows that the brain is somehow able to take into account the intervening eye movement. It is thought that the brain does this by temporarily recording a copy of the command for the eye movement, and comparing this to the remembered image of the target. This is called spatial updating. Neurophysiologists, having recorded from cortical areas for saccades during spatial updating, have found that memory-related signals get remapped during each saccade.

=== Trans-saccadic perception ===
It is also thought that perceptual memory is updated during saccades so that information gathered across fixations can be compared and synthesized. However, the entire visual image is not updated during each saccade. Some scientists believe that this is the same as visual working memory, but as in spatial updating the eye movement has to be accounted for. The process of retaining information across a saccade is called trans-saccadic memory, and the process of integrating information from more than one fixation is called trans-saccadic integration.

== Comparative physiology ==
Saccades are a widespread phenomenon across animals with image-forming visual systems. They have been observed in animals across three phyla, including animals that do not have a fovea (most vertebrates do) and animals that cannot move their eyes independently of their head (such as insects). Therefore, while saccades serve in humans and other primates to increase the effective visual resolution of a scene, there must be additional reasons for the behavior. The most frequently suggested of these reasons is to avoid blurring of the image, which would occur if the response time of a photoreceptor cell is longer than the time a given portion of the image is stimulating that photoreceptor as the image drifts across the eye.

In birds, saccadic eye movements serve a further function. The avian retina is highly developed. It is thicker than the mammalian retina, has a higher metabolic activity, and has less vasculature obstruction, for greater visual acuity. Because of this, the retinal cells must obtain nutrients via diffusion through the choroid and from the vitreous humor. The pecten is a specialised structure in the avian retina. It is a highly vascular structure that projects into the vitreous humor. Experiments show that, during saccadic eye oscillations (which occupy up to 12% of avian viewing time), the pecten oculi acts as an agitator, propelling perfusate (natural lubricants) toward the retina. Thus, in birds, saccadic eye movements appear to be important in retinal nutrition and cellular respiration.

== Saccade-induced retrieval enhancement ==
Saccade-induced retrieval enhancement (SIRE) refers to the observation that when human subjects are instructed to actively make saccadic eye movements before a memory test, their performance improves. The effect is strongest in right-handed people and for horizontal saccades.

== See also ==
- Chronostasis
- Eye movement
- Eye movement in language reading
- Eye movement in music reading
- Eye tracking
- Frame rate
- Frontal eye fields
- List of cognitive biases
- Supplementary eye field
- Medial eye fields
- Microsaccade
- Paramedian pontine reticular formation
- Raster scan
- Saccadic masking
- Saccadic suppression of image displacement
- Smooth pursuit
- Transsaccadic memory
- Whip pan
