= Saccadic suppression of image displacement =

Visual perception phenomenon

Saccadic suppression of image displacement (SSID) is the phenomenon in visual perception where the brain selectively blocks visual processing during eye movements in such a way that large changes in object location in the visual scene during a saccade or blink are not detected.

The phenomenon described by Bridgeman et al. (Bridgeman, G., Hendry, D., & Stark, L., 1975) is characterized by the inability to detect changes in the location of a target when the change occurs immediately before, during, or shortly after the saccade, following a time course very similar to that of the suppression of visual sensitivity, with a magnitude perhaps even more striking than that of visual sensitivity (4 log units vs. 0.5–0.7 log units (Bridgeman et al., 1975; Volkmann, 1986)).

These results indicate that the human perceptual system neglects many useful pieces of information when it comes to spatially localizing target displacements occurring during a saccade. Surprisingly, in contrast to the perceptual system, the motor system is able to access precise spatial information in order to render precise motor actions during a saccade (Bridgeman, Lewis, Heit, & Nagle, 1979; Prablanc & Martin, 1992).

== Elimination ==
If a target which is displaced during a saccade is not present at the end of the saccade, but reappears a short time later after a blank interval, subjects are able to regain the ability to successfully detect whether the target has moved. In these studies it was discovered that as the gap between the end of the saccade and the presentation of the shifted target increases, subjects become much more accurate at detecting displacement, and that with a gap of 150 ms participants had reached ceiling in their performance. Deubel and colleagues termed this the 'blanking effect' (Deubel et al., 1996; Deubel et al., 2004).

These results suggest that while extra-retinal information is present, and contains accurate localization information, it is only used when other information is not available – specifically retinal scene information. According to this model, three sources of information must be present in order to maintain visual constancy and successfully determine the direction of a target displacement: the target position prior to the saccade, extra retinal information, and a retinal error signal from the corrective saccade to determine the actual direction of target movement by comparing it to the efference copy and proprioceptive inflow (Deubel et al., 1996).

== Tactile suppression of displacement ==
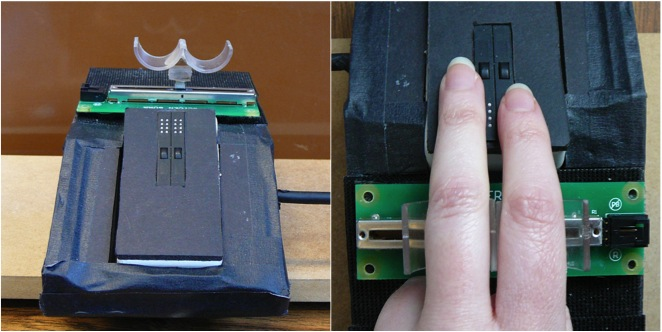
Apparatus. Refreshable Braille cells are embedded in an inclined surface (left). A sliding potentiometer supports two semicylindrical cradles forming a guide that can be relocated on a Velcro surface to accommodate the participants' anatomical differences.

Using the device pictured on the right, Ziat et al. (2010) demonstrated a phenomenon akin to the saccadic suppression of image displacement (Bridgeman et al., 1975) in the tactile system. Under certain conditions participants failed to detect that dots had changed location as they moved their fingers over the tactile display.

== See also ==
- Chronostasis
- Frame rate
- List of cognitive biases
- Raster scan
- Saccadic masking
- Transsaccadic memory
