= Ocular flutter =

Eye movement disorder

Ocular flutter is an opsoclonic disorder that results in horizontal saccades.

It is caused by damage to the brainstem paramedian pontine reticular formation cells or the cerebellar neurons controlling those cells.

== See also ==
- Nystagmus
- Opsoclonus
