= Paris in the the Spring =

Informal psychological test

Paris in the the Spring is a phrase often used in an informal psychological test. The phrase "Paris in the the Spring" is written with an extra "the". A subject is asked to read the text, and will often jump to conclusions and fail to notice the extra "the", especially when there is a line break between the two thes.

The second ‘the’ is skipped because of saccades, jerky movements that eyes make when looking around. The brain counteracts these movements by steadying them and making everything appear smooth. While the brain is using saccadic movements to read, it searches for the most important words and skips over the less important ones, and fills them in using the words around it and what the brain sees when it quickly skips over it. For instance, in ‘Paris in the the Spring’, the eyes will read Paris and quickly move ahead to Spring, and just glance over ‘in the the’, leading the mind to completely disregard the second ‘the’.
