= GLUT1 deficiency =

De Vivo disease
- Other names: De Vivo disease
- De Vivo disease has an autosomal dominant pattern of inheritance
- Specialty: Medical genetics
- Frequency: 0.0005%

GLUT1 deficiency syndrome, also known as GLUT1-DS, De Vivo disease or Glucose transporter type 1 deficiency syndrome, is an autosomal dominant genetic metabolic disorder associated with a deficiency of GLUT1, the protein that transports glucose across the blood brain barrier. Glucose Transporter Type 1 Deficiency Syndrome has an estimated birth incidence of 1 in 90,000 to 1 in 24,300. This birth incidence translates to an estimated prevalence of 3,000 to 7,000 in the U.S.

== Presentation ==
GLUT1 deficiency is characterized by an array of signs and symptoms including mental and motor developmental delays, infantile seizures refractory to anticonvulsants, ataxia, dystonia, dysarthria, opsoclonus, spasticity, other paroxysmal neurologic phenomena and sometimes deceleration of head growth also known as microcephaly. The presence and severity of symptoms vary considerably between affected individuals. Individuals with the disorder generally have frequent seizures (epilepsy), often beginning in the first months of life. In newborns, the first sign may be involuntary eye movements that are rapid and irregular. Patients typically begin to experience seizures between three and six months of age, but some occur much later. Other seizure types may occur, including generalized tonic clonic, focal, myoclonic, atypical absence, atonic or unclassified.

Mothers of infants with this disorder usually have uneventful pregnancies and deliveries, with the child appearing normal and within typical birth weight and length ranges. Infants with GLUT1 deficiency syndrome have a normal head size at birth, but the growth of the brain and skull is slow, in severe cases resulting in an abnormally small head size (microcephaly). Typically, seizures start between one and four months in 90% of cases with abnormal eye movements and apneic episodes preceding the onset of seizures in some cases. Seizures usually are complex to begin with and later become more generalized. Seizure frequency is variable and a history of decreasing frequency during times of ketosis may prompt a diagnosis. It is estimated that 10% of individuals with Glut 1 Deficiency do not have seizures and symptoms are typically less severe in these cases. Most of these non-epileptic cases will still have developmental delay, intellectual delays and movement disorders such as ataxia, alternating hemiplegia or dystonia.

Some symptoms may be present all the time (like walking difficulties), while other signs may come and go (like seizures or poor balance). These findings can be clustered under three major domains: cognition, behavior and movement.

=== Effects ===
The syndrome can cause infantile seizures refractory to anticonvulsive drugs, developmental delay, acquired microcephaly and neurologic manifestations including spasticity, hypotonia and ataxia. The frequency, severity and types of seizures may vary considerably among GLUT1 deficiency patients and do not necessarily correspond to the severity of other symptoms. Most seizures in GLUT1 deficiency patients are not easily treated with anti-seizure medications. A minority of GLUT1 deficiency patients (approximately 10%) do not experience seizures. Cognitive symptoms often become apparent as developmental milestones are delayed. Cognitive deficits range from subtle learning difficulties to severe intellectual disabilities. Often speech and language are impaired. Behavioral symptoms affect relations with other people and may include short attention span, intractability, and delays in achieving age-appropriate behaviors. Sociability with peers, however, is a strength in GLUT1 deficiency patients. Movement symptoms relate to the quality of motor functions. Walking may be delayed or difficult because legs are stiff (spasticity), balance is poor (ataxia) or posture is twisted (dystonia). Fine motor deficits may affect speech quality and manipulative skills, such as writing. These abnormalities may be constant or intermittent (paroxysmal). Paroxysmal exercise-induced dyskinesia (PED) may also be present. Other intermittent symptoms may include headaches, confusion, and loss of energy. Episodes of confusion, lack of energy/stamina, and/or muscle twitches may occur; particularly during periods without food. Some young patients experience occasional abnormal eye movements that may resemble opsoclonus or nystagmus. The rapid eye movements that some Glut 1 patients exhibit are rapid, multidirectional, and there is often a head movement in the same direction as the eye movement. These abnormal eye movements were recently named aberrant gaze saccades. Hemiplegia or alternating intermittent hemiplegia may occur in some patients and mimic stroke-like symptoms. Another characteristic of GLUT1 deficiency is that symptoms are sensitive to food (e.g. symptoms that can be temporarily improved by intake of carbohydrates), and symptoms may be worse in the morning upon and just after waking. All symptoms may be aggravated or triggered by factors such as hunger, fatigue, heat, anxiety, and sickness. The symptom picture for each patient may evolve and change over time as children with GLUT1 deficiency grow and develop through adolescence and into adulthood. Data on adult Glut1DS are just emerging. Changes in symptomatology over time include a shift from infantile-childhood onset epilepsy to adolescent-adult onset movement disorders including PED.

== Genetics ==
The GLUT1 protein that transports glucose across the blood brain barrier is encoded by the SLC2A1 gene, located on chromosome 1.

In GLUT1 deficiency syndrome, one of the two genes is damaged by a mutation and an insufficient amount protein is made. As a result, insufficient glucose is passing the blood brain barrier. Having less functional GLUT1 protein reduces the amount of glucose available to brain cells, which affects brain development and function. Because glucose is the primary source of fuel for the brain, patients with GLUT1 deficiency have insufficient cellular energy to permit normal brain growth and function.

Around 90% of cases of GLUT1 deficiency syndrome are de novo mutations of the SLC2A1 gene (a mutation not present in the parents, but present in one of the two copies of the gene in the baby), although it can be inherited.

Glut 1 Deficiency can be inherited in an autosomal dominant manner. A person with GLUT1 deficiency syndrome has a 50% chance of passing along the altered SLC2A1 gene to his or her offspring.

In a study focusing on GLUT1 mice model brain slides, physiological glucose concentration was found to be a modulator of frequency oscillations and less frequent 30–50 Hz or gamma oscillations.

== Diagnosis ==
Early diagnosis is crucial in order to initiate treatment during the important early stages of brain development. To make a proper diagnosis, it is important to know the various symptoms of GLUT1 deficiency and how those symptoms evolve with age.

GLUT1 deficiency is diagnosed based on the clinical features in combination with determining the glucose concentration in the CSF and/or a genetic analysis through a lumbar puncture (spinal tap). A low glucose value in CSF (<2.2 mmol/L) or lowered CSF/plasma glucose ratio (<0.4)are indicatieve of GLUT1 deficiency. A genetic mutation in the SLC2A1 gene also confirms the diagnosis, although mutations have not been identified in approximately 15% of GLUT1 deficiency patients. A highly specialized lab test called the red blood cell uptake assay may confirm GLUT1 deficiency but is not commercially available.

== Management ==
Anti-seizure medications are generally not effective, since they do not provide nourishment to the starved brain.

Once diagnosed, a medically supervised ketogenic diet is usually recommended as it can help to control seizures. The ketogenic diet is the current standard of care treatment, with 80% of patients having >90% seizure reduction and improving some movement disorders in approximately two thirds of GLUT1 deficiency patients. There is also some evidence of some cognitive benefits for GLUT1 deficiency patients on a ketogenic diet, and most parents report improved energy, alertness, balance, coordination, and concentration, especially when the diet is started early in childhood.

The ketogenic diet is a diet high in fat and low in protein and carbohydrates, with up to 90% of calories obtained from fat. Since the diet is low in carbohydrates, the body gets little glucose, normally the main energy source. The fat in the diet is converted by the liver in ketone bodies, which causes a build up of ketones in the blood stream, called ketosis. Ketone bodies are transported across the blood-brain barrier by other means than the GLUT1 protein and thus serve as an alternative fuel for the brain when glucose is not available.

While ketogenic diets have been proven effective to control seizures and relieve some movement disorders in many GLUT1 deficiency patients, some patients do not respond as well as others. In addition, some critical symptoms, including cognitive deficits and certain movement difficulties, tend to persist in GLUT1 deficiency patients treated by a ketogenic diet, raising the question whether GLUT1 deficiency is caused simply by a lack of proper brain energy or if there are more complicated and widespread systems and processes affected.

The ketogenic diet must be carefully crafted and tailored to meet the needs of each patient and reduce the risk of side effects. It should only be used under the care of medical professionals and dietitians, and it may take some time to establish the ideal ratio of fat versus proteins and carbohydrates and other diet variables for each individual patient to experience optimal tolerance and benefits. Variations on the ketogenic diet, including the Modified Atkins Diet, and diets based on MCT oil have also been shown to be beneficial for some GLUT1 deficiency patients.

While the classic ketogenic diet is commonly used for younger children, compliance with the ketogenic diet can be difficult for older children and adults. In recent years, the Modified Atkins Diet, and MCT oil based diets, have gained increasing acceptance among doctors treating these groups and may be more feasible for quality of life and compliance. There is growing empirical evidence that these diets can provide at least some of the benefits of the classical ketogenic diet for some GLUT1 deficiency patients.

Ketone esters are an area of dietary therapy currently under investigation for potential treatment of GLUT1 deficiency and other medical conditions. Ketone esters are synthetic ketones that break down into natural ketones when metabolized. Ketone esters have been shown in recent research to improve seizures and movement disorders in GLUT1 deficient mice, but human studies have not yet been conducted.

Triheptanoin (C7 oil), a triglyceride oil synthesized from castor beans. is an investigational pharmaceutical-grade medical food that has shown potential as a treatment for a number of inherited metabolic diseases. When metabolized by the body, C7 oil produces ketones similar to those produced on a ketogenic diet in addition to other types of ketones that are thought to fulfill further metabolic requirements in the absence of sufficient glucose. A phase 3 clinical trial however failed to find an improvement in patients with GLUT1 DS with disabling movement disorders.

The inhibition of insulin production to increase glucose in the blood with the medicine diazoxide, in combination with continuous glucose monitoring, has been successful in one adolescent. The increased blood glucose also increases the availability of glucose in the brain, through the increased transfer of more glucose through the GLUT1-protein. She became seizure-free, became more physically active and had improved cognition.

Researchers are studying gene therapy as a possible effective treatment for Glut 1 Deficiency.

Therapies and rehabilitative services are beneficial since most GLUT1 deficiency patients experience movement disturbances as well as speech and language disorders. Occupational, physical, and speech/language therapies are standard for most patients, especially in childhood. Many families greatly benefit from other therapies such as aquatic therapy, hippotherapy, specific learning strategies, and behavioral therapy.

Glut 1 patients Weak Areas are lowered IQ and adaptive behavior scores, expressive-language deficits, weakness in fine motor skills, limited visual attention to details, weakness in abstract analytical skills, and weakness in transfer of learning to new contexts.
