= FRMD7 =

Protein-coding gene in the species Homo sapiens

Identifiers
- Aliases: FRMD7, NYS, NYS1, XIPAN, FERM domain containing 7
- External IDs: OMIM: 300628; MGI: 2686379; GeneCards: FRMD7

Gene location (Mouse)
Chr.	X chromosome (mouse)
Band	X|X A5	Start	49,984,057 bp
Band	X|X A5	End	50,031,587 bp
RNA expression pattern
Bgee	Human / Mouse (ortholog); Top expressed in: Achilles tendon; kidney; myometrium; smooth muscle tissue; synovial membrane; synovial joint; ascending aorta; metanephros; liver; fallopian tube / Top expressed in: olfactory bulb; embryo; dentate gyrus of hippocampal formation granule cell; Cortex of frontal lobe; quadriceps femoris muscle; hippocampus proper; tail of embryo; yolk sac; neural layer of retina; ovary; More reference expression data
BioGPS	n/a
Gene ontology
Molecular function	molecular function
Cellular component	cell projection; cytoskeleton; neuron projection; soma; growth cone; extracellular space
Biological process	positive regulation of small GTPase mediated signal transduction; negative regulation of stress fiber assembly; positive regulation of lamellipodium assembly; negative regulation of protein binding; nervous system development; regulation of neuron projection development
Sources:Amigo / QuickGO
Orthologs
Databases	NCBI: entry
Species	Human	Mouse
Entrez	90167	385354
Ensembl	n/a	ENSMUSG00000036131
UniProt	Q6ZUT3	A2AD83
RefSeq (mRNA)	NM_001306193; NM_194277	NM_001190332
RefSeq (protein)	NP_001293122; NP_919253	NP_001177261
Location (UCSC)	n/a	Chr X: 49.98 – 50.03 Mb
PubMed search
- Wikidata
View/Edit Human	View/Edit Mouse

FERM domain-containing protein 7 is a protein that in humans is encoded by the FRMD7 gene.
