= Eye field =

Eye field may refer to:

- Frontal eye fields, a region located in the prefrontal cortex
- Medial eye fields, areas in the frontal lobe of a primate brain
- Supplementary eye fields, areas on the dorsal-medial surface of the frontal lobe of a primate brain
