= Microsaccade =

Fixational eye movement

Microsaccades are a kind of fixational eye movement. They are small, jerk-like, involuntary eye movements, similar to miniature versions of voluntary saccades. They typically occur during prolonged visual fixation (of at least several seconds), not only in humans, but also in animals with foveal vision (primates, cats, dogs etc.). Microsaccade amplitudes vary from 2 to 120 arcminutes. The first empirical evidence for their existence was provided by Robert Darwin, the father of Charles Darwin.

== Function ==
The role of microsaccades in visual perception has been a highly debated topic that is still largely unresolved. It has been proposed that microsaccades correct displacements in eye position produced by drifts, although non-corrective microsaccades also occur. Some work has suggested that microsaccades are directly correlated with the perception of illusory motion. Although microsaccades can enhance vision of fine spatial detail, they can also impair visual perception in that they are associated with saccadic suppression. Microsaccades are also believed to be important for preventing the retinal image from fading.

Microsaccades are tied to complex visual processing like reading. The specific timing pattern of microsaccades in humans changes during reading based on the structure of the word being read.

Experiments in neurophysiology from different laboratories showed that fixational eye movements, particularly microsaccades, strongly modulate the activity of neurons in the visual areas of the macaque brain. In the lateral geniculate nucleus (LGN) and the primary visual cortex (V1), microsaccades can move a stationary stimulus in and out of a neuron's receptive field, thereby producing transient neural responses. Microsaccades might account for much of the response variability of neurons in visual area V1 of the awake monkey.

Current research in visual neuroscience and psychophysics is investigating how microsaccades relate to fixation correction, memory, control of binocular fixation disparity and attentional shifts.

== Visual impact of microsaccades ==
Microsaccades play a crucial role in the perception of objects. Researchers discovered that these motions improve humans' ability to catch minute details in a scene. Microsaccades help gain focus from Troxler fading. Swiss philosopher Troxler had fixated images which tend to fade away during normal vision in 1804. Troxler effect is the fixating one's gaze in the visual field. A static field that would slowly fade into a blur. Microssacades are significant since it prevents image blur. The brain activity stimulated by microsaccades across the visual system can aid in determining the neural coding of visibility because microsaccades are essential for preserving visibility during fixation. The neuronal reactions to alterations in visual inputs brought on by microsaccadic retinal displacements are known as visual responses to microsaccades.

== Mechanisms ==
Microsaccades are generated through neural activity in the brain regions responsible for eye movement control. The superior colliculus plays an important role in initiating microsaccades. Neural circuits within the superior colliculus integrate sensory inputs and motor commands, resulting in the precise, coordinated movements of microsaccades.

This process involves excitatory and inhibitory interactions between neurons in different layers of the superior colliculus. Inputs from cortical areas such as the frontal eye fields and parietal cortex modulate these interactions, influencing microsaccade frequency and direction. Experiments in primates have shown that electrically stimulating specific regions of the superior colliculus can evoke microsaccade-like movements, highlighting its role in their generation.

In addition to the superior colliculus, subcortical structures like the basal ganglia may regulate the initiation or suppression of microsaccades. The basal ganglia's influence on fixation and spontaneous eye movements patterns suggest a contribution to attention shifts and stabilization during visual fixation.

== Microsaccades in disorders ==
=== In neurological disorders ===
Microsaccades are disrupted in various neurological disorders, including ADHD, schizophrenia, and Parkinson's disease, resulting in gaze instability during fixation. In ADHD, individuals show increased microsaccade rates and unstable gaze, which may improve with medication. In schizophrenia, microsaccades reveal similar total eye movement counts to healthy controls despite differences in large saccades. Parkinson's disease is associated with larger, more frequent, and slower microsaccades.

=== In ophthalmologic disorders ===
Microsaccades are disrupted in several ophthalmologic disorders, including amblyopia, strabismus, myopia, and macular disease, reflecting the impact of visual impairment on eye movement control. In amblyopia, monocular fixation with the amblyopic eye leads to increased drift and frequent saccadic intrusions, especially in cases involving strabismus. Myopia is associated with larger microsaccades as uncorrected refractive error worsens, linking blurred vision to fixational instability. Along with this, macular disease results in increased drift and larger microsaccadic amplitudes, which correlate with visual acuity loss and serve as signs of fixation instability.

== See also ==
- Fixation (visual)
- Ocular tremor
- Saccade
