= Stabilized images =

Images that remain immobile on the retina

In vision science, stabilized images are images that remain immobile on the retina. Under natural viewing conditions, the eyes are always in motion. Small eye movements continually occur even when attempting fixation (the maintenance of steady gaze on a single point). Experiments in the early 1950s established that stabilized images result in the fading and disappearance of the visual percept, possibly due to retinal adaptation to a stationary field. In 2007, studies indicated that stabilizing vision between saccades selectively impairs vision of fine spatial detail.

Images can be stabilized mechanically with optics mounted on the eye itself, or the image can be continually updated on a display to counteract the effects of eye movements. Because no existing method creates perfect image stabilization, this leaves open the question of whether all perfectly stabilized images disappear completely.
