= Medial eye fields =

Medial eye fields are areas in the frontal lobe of the primate brain that play a role in visually guided eye movement. Most neuroscientists refer to this area as the supplementary eye fields. Eye fields are divided into two hemispheres regulated by sonic hedgehog (Shh) and Six3.

== See also ==
- Saccade
- Smooth pursuit
- Supplementary eye fields
