= Supplementary eye field =

Region of the frontal cortex of the brain

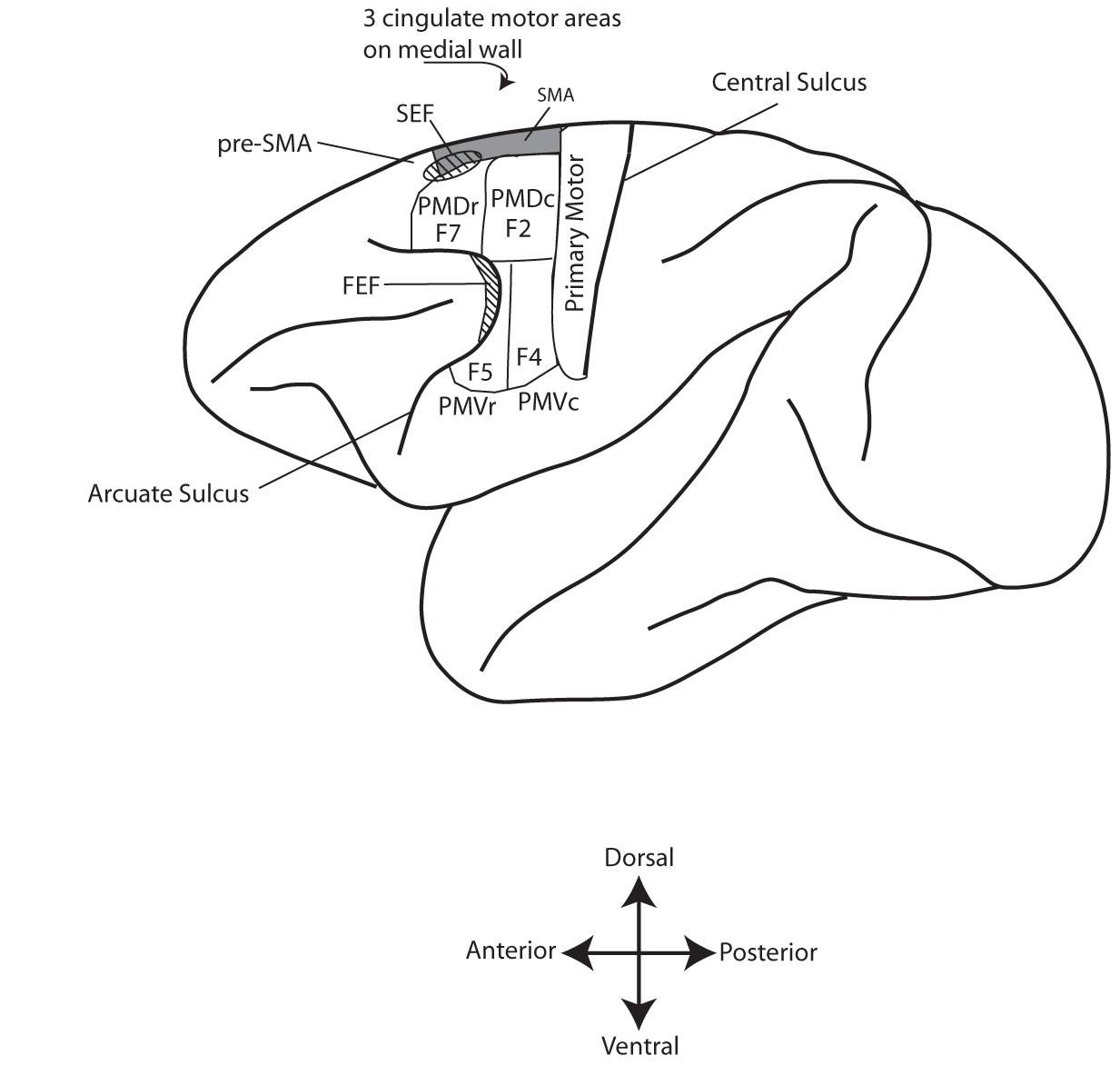
Figure 1. Motor Cortex of the Monkey Brain: Pictured above are the approximate locations of the SEF and FEF in the monkey brain which we know today.

Supplementary eye field (SEF) is the name for the anatomical area of the dorsal medial frontal lobe of the primate cerebral cortex that is indirectly involved in the control of saccadic eye movements. Evidence for a supplementary eye field was first shown by Schlag, and Schlag-Rey. Current research strives to explore the SEF's contribution to visual search and its role in visual salience. The SEF constitutes together with the frontal eye fields (FEF), the intraparietal sulcus (IPS), and the superior colliculus (SC) one of the most important brain areas involved in the generation and control of eye movements, particularly in the direction contralateral to their location. Its precise function is not yet fully known. Neural recordings in the SEF show signals related to both vision and saccades somewhat like the frontal eye fields and superior colliculus, but currently most investigators think that the SEF has a special role in high level aspects of saccade control, like complex spatial transformations, learned transformations, and executive cognitive functions.

== History (research) ==
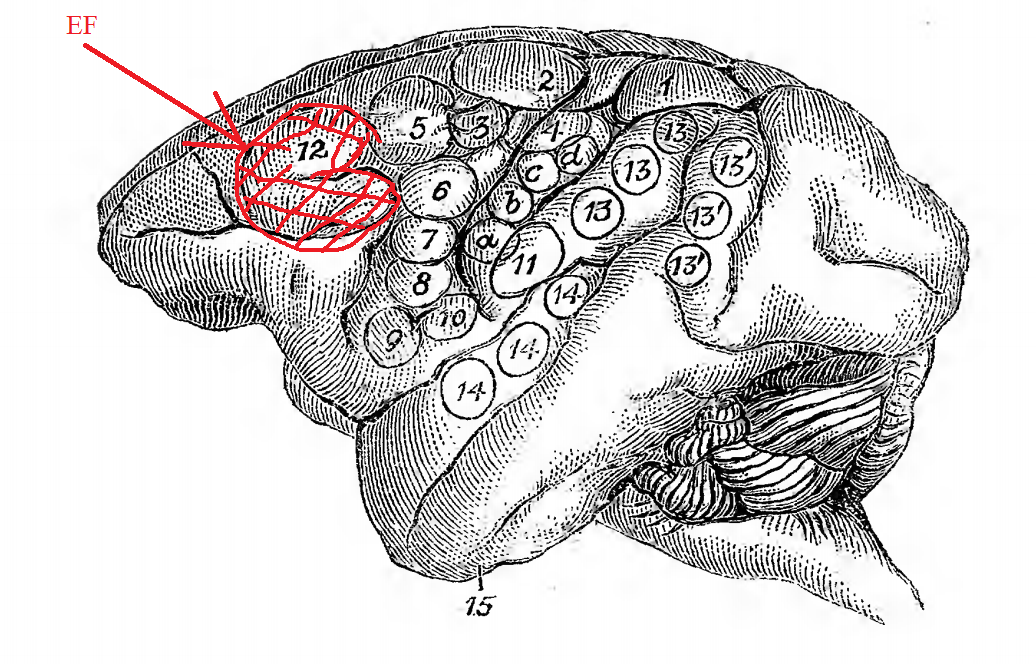
Figure 2. Ferrier's Monkey Brain Map (1874). The highlighted area labeled 'EF' is the area he observed to cause eye and head movements when electrically stimulated.

In 1874, David Ferrier, a Scottish neurologist first described the frontal eye fields (FEF). He noted that unilateral electrical stimulation of the frontal lobe of macaque monkeys caused "turning of the eyes and head to the opposite side" (Fig. 2). The brain area allotted to the FEF by Ferrier's original map was actually quite large and also encompassed the area which we now call the SEF. A century's worth of experimental findings following Ferrier's work have led to shrinking the FEF's size.

During the 1950s, surgical treatment of epileptic patients was being conducted. Neurosurgeons were removing lesions and other parts of the brain thought to be involved in causing the patient's seizures. Treatment of these epileptic patients lead to the discovery of many new brain areas by observant neurosurgeons concerned with the post-surgical implications of removing sections of the brain. Through electrical stimulation studies an area called the supplementary motor area (SMA) was observed and documented by the neurosurgeon Wilder Penfield in 1950. As Penfield had noted the induction of gaze shifts by stimulation of the rostral part of the SMA, another eye field's existence was postulated.

In 1987, the SEF was finally characterized by Schlag and Schlag-Rey as an area where low intensity electrical stimulation could evoke saccades, similar to the FEF. It was named as such to complement the SMA's name.

== Characteristics ==
=== Location ===
Figure 3. Brodmann Brain Map: The SEF is located in the rostral supplementary motor area which corresponds to Area 6 in the above map. For reference, the FEF is located in Area 8.

The eye field originally defined by Ferrier's map of the frontal cortex extended medially to the dorsal surface of the brain (Fig. 2). But the FEF proper has since shrunk into the rostral back of the arcuate sulcus (Fig. 1). Experimenters have since established that the FEF and SEF are two separate and distinct brain areas responsible for saccade initiation through cerebral blood flow, and subdural electrode array studies.

In humans, the SEF is located in the rostral supplementary motor area (SMA). It is located in Brodmann area 6 (BA6) which corresponds to area F7, the premotor cortex. Based on single unit recording and microstimulation it has been established that the SEF is caudally contiguous with the parts of the SMA which represent orofacial, and forelimb movements.

The FEF is located in Brodmann area 8 which is just anterior to the premotor cortex (BA6) (Fig. 3).

=== Role ===
As opposed to the FEF, the SEF plays an indirect but executive role in saccade initiation. For example, the activity of SEF neurons is not sufficient to control saccade initiation in macaque monkeys performing stop signal go/no-go tasks. In this kind of task a trained monkey is to make a particular response (in this case move its eyes, or produce a saccade) to a stimulus on a screen such as a flashing dot. For the go-task, the monkey is to look at the dot. But for the no-go task, the go signal will appear and be followed by the no-go signal, testing whether the saccade initiation can be inhibited.

In other words, the SEF does not immediately or directly contribute to saccade initiation. But, the SEF is thought to improve saccade production by using prior knowledge of anticipated task requirements to influence saccadic eye movements. It does so by balancing gaze holding and gaze shifting actions, yielding a modest improvement in performance in stop signal tasks by delaying saccade initiation when necessary. It can be thought that the FEF does the driving part of saccade initiation, while the SEF acts as a backseat passenger, advising the driver as to what to do based on past insights. The SEF has recently been found to encode reward prediction error, suggesting that the SEF may actively evaluate decisions based on a value system on an oculomotor basis, independent of other brain regions.

==== Significance ====
The visual system is sensitive to sudden change. If something distracting occurs while a person is performing a task—reading a newspaper, for example—this immediately captures one's attention. This sudden shift can be a distraction but it has been also thought to be a reflex of great importance as identifying and reacting to environmental changes quickly (when needed) can be imperative to survival. Saccadic latency, the time delay between the appearance of a target and the initiation of a saccade, is an important parameter for learning which occulomotor neurons and structures of the brain play what specific roles in saccade initiation. There is much research being conducted on the role of SEF in determining visually salient objects and occurrences, using saccadic latency as the parameter of interest.

SEF activity has been found to govern decisions in smooth pursuit but not the decision itself.

=== Sensory processes ===
The SEF responds to auditory stimuli as well as visual stimuli. Visual responses from the SEF happen later and are much weaker than that observed in the FEF, though. SEF neurons also exhibit non-retinal modulation including anticipation and reward prediction.

== Methodology of study ==
=== Finding the SEF ===
The SEF was defined by the Schlags as a region where low currents (<50μA) evoke saccades. It is still found using this characterization as well as the known neighboring anatomy (Fig. 1).

=== Monkey models ===
SEF research is conducted mainly in monkey models. Typically trained rhesus macaque monkeys are used and surgically implanted with recording chambers. In this fashion, spike and local field potential (LFP) data can be acquired from SEF neurons, using microelectrodes in the recording chamber. Eye movements can also be monitored using eye-tracking camera equipment.

Experiments obviously vary, but to give an example: the monkey might be made to partake in a color visual search task, sitting in front of a computer screen. The monkey would look at a point on the screen which would change from filled in to open at the same time which a colored point of "opposite" color appears on the screen. The monkey would be rewarded for looking at a new spot—"for making a single saccade"—within 2000 ms and then fixating on the spot for 500 ms. Varied tasks such as these are used and data is analyzed to determine the SEF's role in saccade initiation, visual saliency, etc.

== See also ==
- Anatomical terms of location
- Saccade
- Eye movement (sensory)
- Smooth pursuit
- Frontal eye fields
- Superior colliculus
- IPS / LIP
