= Congenital fourth nerve palsy =

- Specialty: Neurology

Congenital fourth nerve palsy is a condition present at birth characterized by a vertical misalignment of the eyes due to a weakness or paralysis of the superior oblique muscle.

Other names for fourth nerve palsy include superior oblique palsy and trochlear nerve palsy. When looking to the right/left the nerve/muscle is not strong enough or is too long and the eye drifts up.

== Signs and symptoms ==
Though present from birth, symptoms of congenital fourth cranial nerve palsy may start as subtle and increase with age. Hence, diagnosis by a healthcare practitioner may not be made until later childhood or adulthood. Young children adopt a compensatory head position in order to compensate for the underacting superior oblique muscle, or have a tendency to close one eye whilst reading. The characteristic head tilt is usually away from the affected side to reduce eye strain and prevent double vision (diplopia). Old photographs may reveal the presence of a consistent head tilt (ocular torticollis) from an early age. Most people with congenital CN IV palsy have facial asymmetry due to the chronic head tilt. Other compensatory measures for congenital fourth nerve palsy are development of large vertical fusional amplitudes and lack of subjective symptoms of torsion, even in the presence of great ocular rotation.

Congenital fourth nerve palsy may remain undetected until adulthood, when intermittent diplopia may arise, due to decompensated ability to overcome the vertical deviation. Until this occurs, many ophthalmologists and optometrists may miss the other signs and symptoms. Reduced vertical fusional reserves result from fatigue (stress, fever, other illnesses, a lot of near work) or simply the effects of old age. Diplopia from congenital fourth nerve palsy has occasionally been reported to manifest transiently during pregnancy. Congenital fourth nerve palsy may also become evident following cataract surgery once binocular vision is restored after a long period of progressive monocular visual loss and accompanying vergence decompensation. People may complain of neck pain, after years of chronic head tilting (ocular torticollis), but this is also encountered in children.

Congenital fourth nerve palsy can affect reading comprehension (and concentration during other near tasks) due to the increased vertical fusional demands and head tilting required to maintain single vision and prevent vertical diplopia. Some people find they lose their place easily while reading, and find a marker or using a finger to guide them helpful. A three step test is useful to determine whether the symptoms conform to the pattern of a fourth nerve palsy.

== Causes ==
The cause of congenital fourth nerve palsy is unclear in most cases. It may be neurogenic in origin, due to a dysgenesis of the CN IV nucleus or nerve, but a clinically similar palsy may result from absence or mechanical dysfunction (e.g., abnormal laxity) of the superior oblique tendon. Usually unilateral, congenital fourth nerve palsies can also occur bilaterally. Bilateral congenital fourth nerve palsy may be unmasked only after corrective surgery of one eye for what was thought to be a unilateral palsy.

== Pathophysiology ==
The fourth cranial nerve innervates the superior oblique muscle for each eye. The superior oblique muscle is one of the six extraocular muscles that allow movement of eye. Specifically, the superior oblique muscle primarily intorts the eye (such that the top of the eye rolls toward the nose), with secondary actions of depression (downgaze) and abduction (looking away from the nose). When this muscle's function is diminished due to a fourth cranial nerve (CN IV) palsy, the affected eye will extort, deviate upward (hypertropia), and, to a smaller extent, drift inward.

== Treatment ==
Congenital fourth cranial nerve palsy can be treated with strabismus surgery, where muscle attachment sites on the globe are modified to realign the eyes. Some eye doctors prefer conservative or no management of congenital fourth nerve palsy. Other eye doctors recommend surgery early in a patient's life to prevent the compensatory torticollis and facial asymmetry that develop with age.

Prism lenses set to make minor optical changes in the vertical alignment may be prescribed instead of or after surgery to fine-tune the correction. Prism lenses do not address torsional misalignment and this may limit their use in certain cases. An additional consideration of prism lenses is that they must be worn at all times. Prism lenses reduce vertical fusional demands by allowing the eyes to rest in their vertically misaligned state. When they are removed the patient may experience vertical diplopia they find hard to resolve due to the rested state of their eyes.

Cases of congenital fourth nerve palsy vary in magnitude and way they affect the motion of the superior oblique muscle. Therefore, different surgeries are available dependent upon the type of misalignment. Sometimes surgery on more than one eye muscle is required. In some simpler, unilateral cases a single surgery may suffice. In these cases the main problem is that the inferior oblique muscle of the same eye acts unopposed by the weakened superior oblique muscle, pulling the eye up. An example of a safe and effective procedure is a disinsertion of the inferior oblique muscle to allow it to reattach itself further down the globe of the eye. This acts to 'weaken' its action and allow the eye to move back into a more neutral alignment.

In all cases of congenital fourth nerve palsy, it is important to see an experienced strabismologist about management/treatment options. A strabismologist is an ophthalmologist (eye doctor) specialising in eye movement disorders.

A Cochrane Systematic Review compared several surgical treatments (myectomy, recession, anterior transposition, disinsertion) in people with fourth nerve palsy. While there was not enough high-quality evidence to recommend the best surgical treatment, all four types of surgery did result in a reduction of hypertropia. One study comparing inferior oblique anterior transposition with disinsertion found that participants who underwent anterior transposition had a greater proportion of participants who had resolved head tilt, and a lesser proportion of participants requiring a second surgery, compared to disinsertion. However, all participants who underwent anterior transposition developed elevation deficiency.

== See also ==
- Eye movements
- Fourth nerve palsy
