= Eye movement =

Movement of the eyes

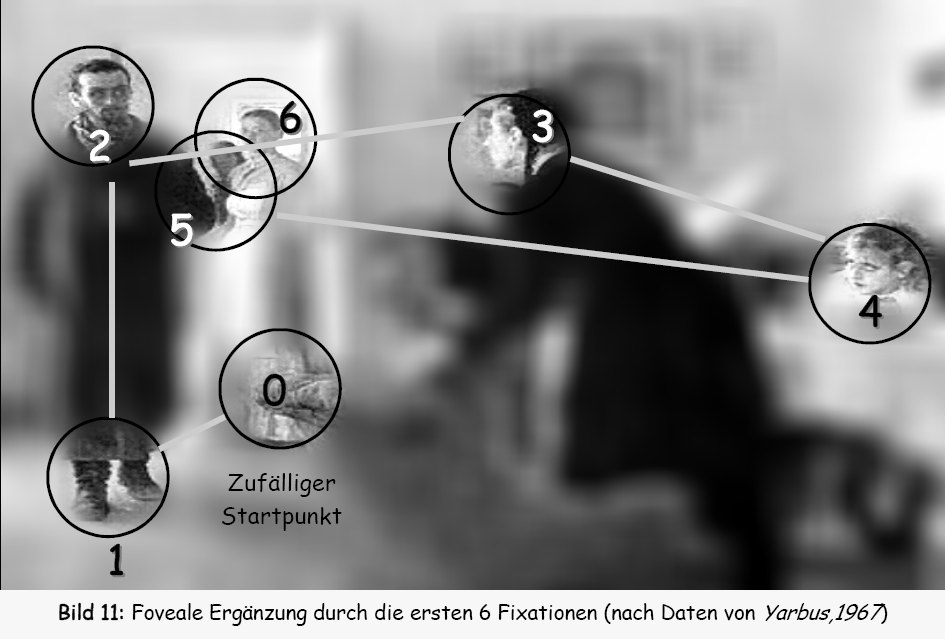
An example of eye movement over a photograph over the span of just two seconds

Eye movement includes the voluntary and involuntary movement of the eyes. Eye movements are used by a number of animals (e.g. primates, rodents, flies, birds, fish, cats, crabs, octopus) to fixate, inspect and track visual objects of interests. A special type of eye movement, rapid eye movement, occurs during REM sleep.

The eyes are the visual organs of the human body, and move using a system of six muscles. The retina, a specialised type of tissue containing photoreceptors, senses light. These specialised cells convert light into electrochemical signals. These signals travel along the optic nerve fibers to the brain, where they are interpreted as vision in the visual cortex.

Primates and many other vertebrates use three types of voluntary eye movement to track objects of interest: smooth pursuit, vergence shifts and saccades. These types of movements appear to be initiated by a small cortical region in the brain's frontal lobe. This is corroborated by removal of the frontal lobe. In this case, the reflexes (such as reflex shifting the eyes to a moving light) are intact, though the voluntary control is obliterated.

== Anatomy ==
=== Muscles ===
Six extraocular muscles facilitate eye movement. These muscles arise from the common tendinous ring (annulus of Zinn) in the orbit (eye cavity), and attach to the eyeball. The six muscles are the lateral, medial, inferior and superior recti muscles, and the inferior and superior oblique muscles. The muscles cause movement of the eyeball by pulling the eyeball towards the muscle when contracting and by letting it go when relaxing. For example, the lateral rectus is on the lateral side of the eyeball. When it contracts, the eyeball moves so that the pupil looks outwards. The medial rectus causes the eyeball to look inwards; the inferior rectus downwards and outwards, and the superior rectus upwards and outwards. The superior oblique muscle and inferior oblique muscle attach at angles to the eyeball. The superior oblique muscle moves the eye downwards and inwards whereas the inferior oblique muscle moves the eye upwards and outwards.

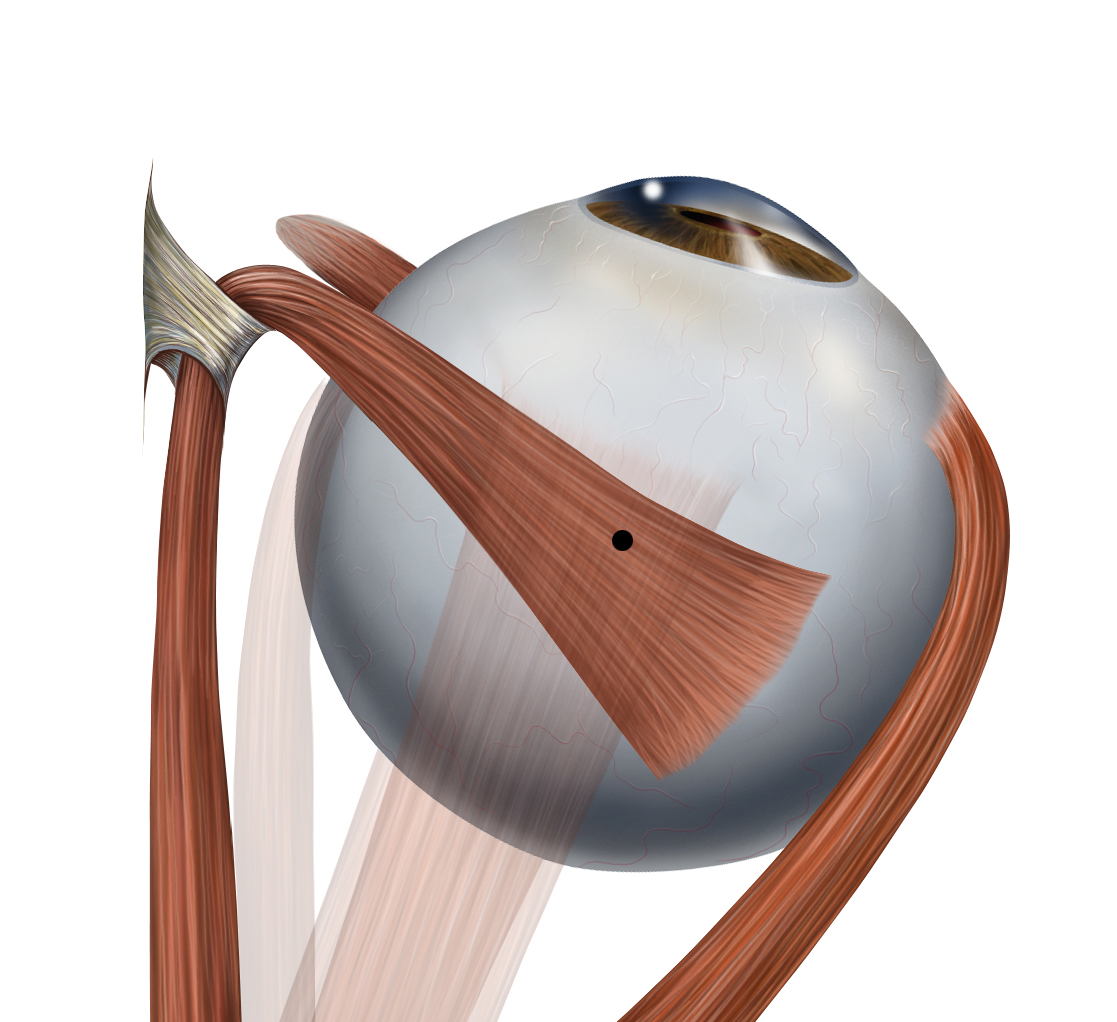
Eye movement of lateral rectus muscle, superior view

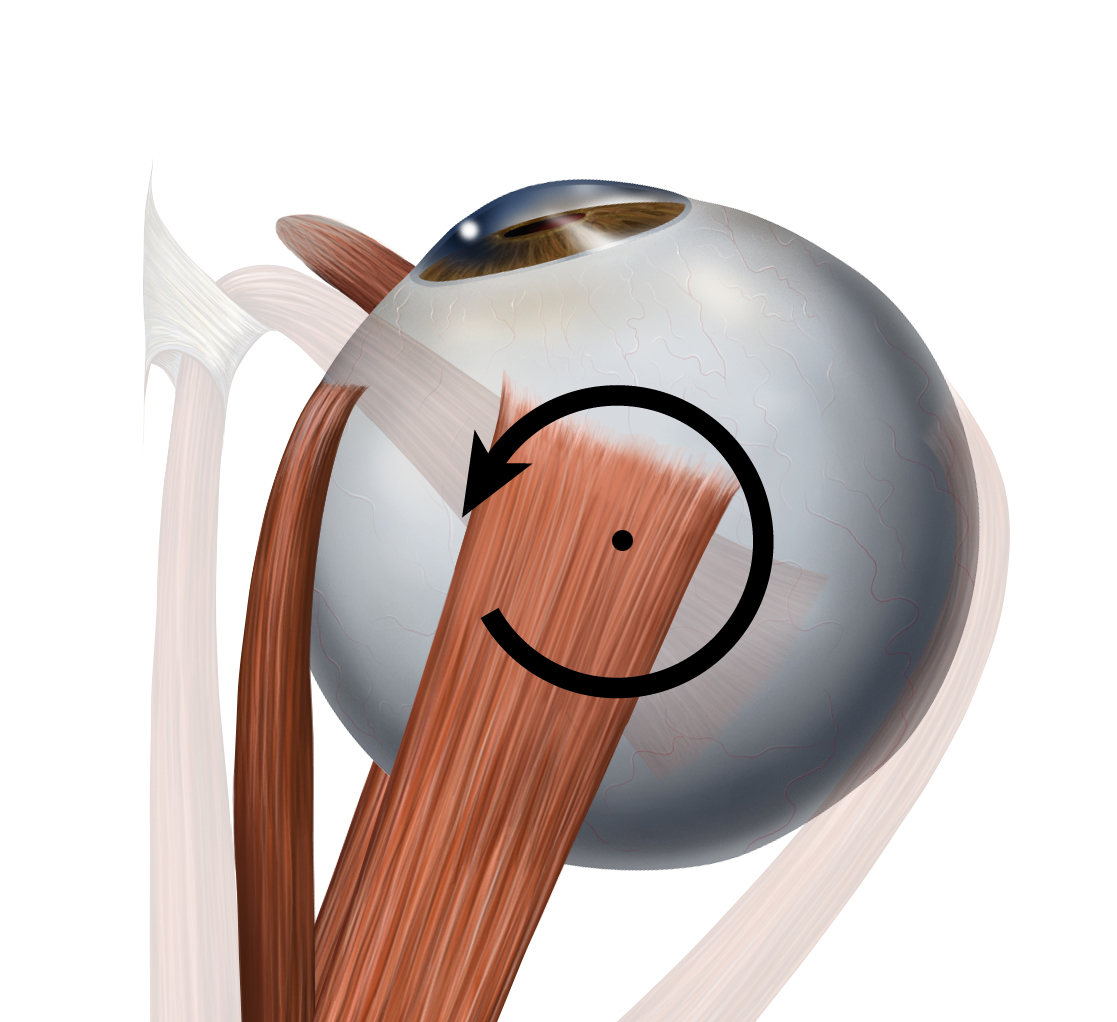
Eye movement of medial rectus muscle, superior view

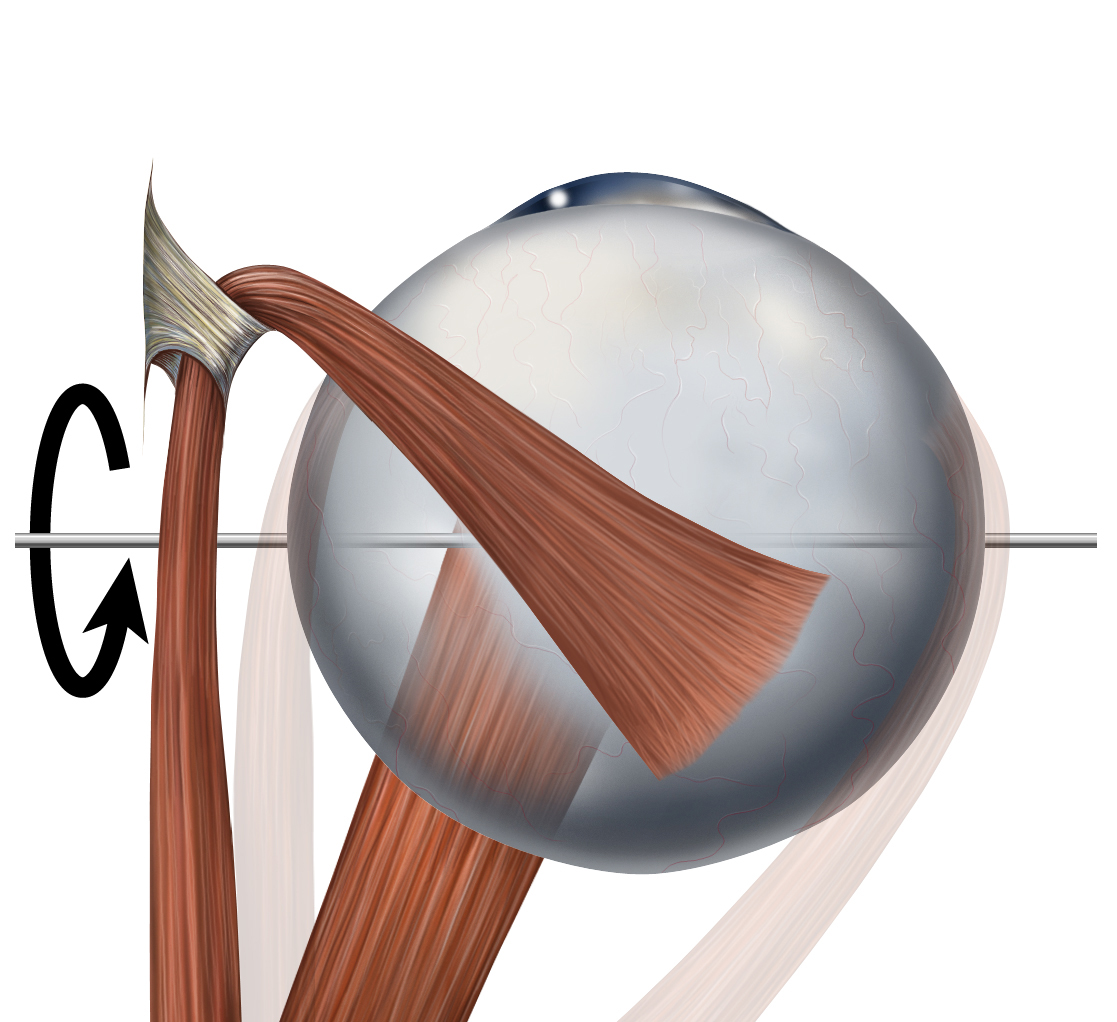
Eye movement of inferior rectus muscle, superior view

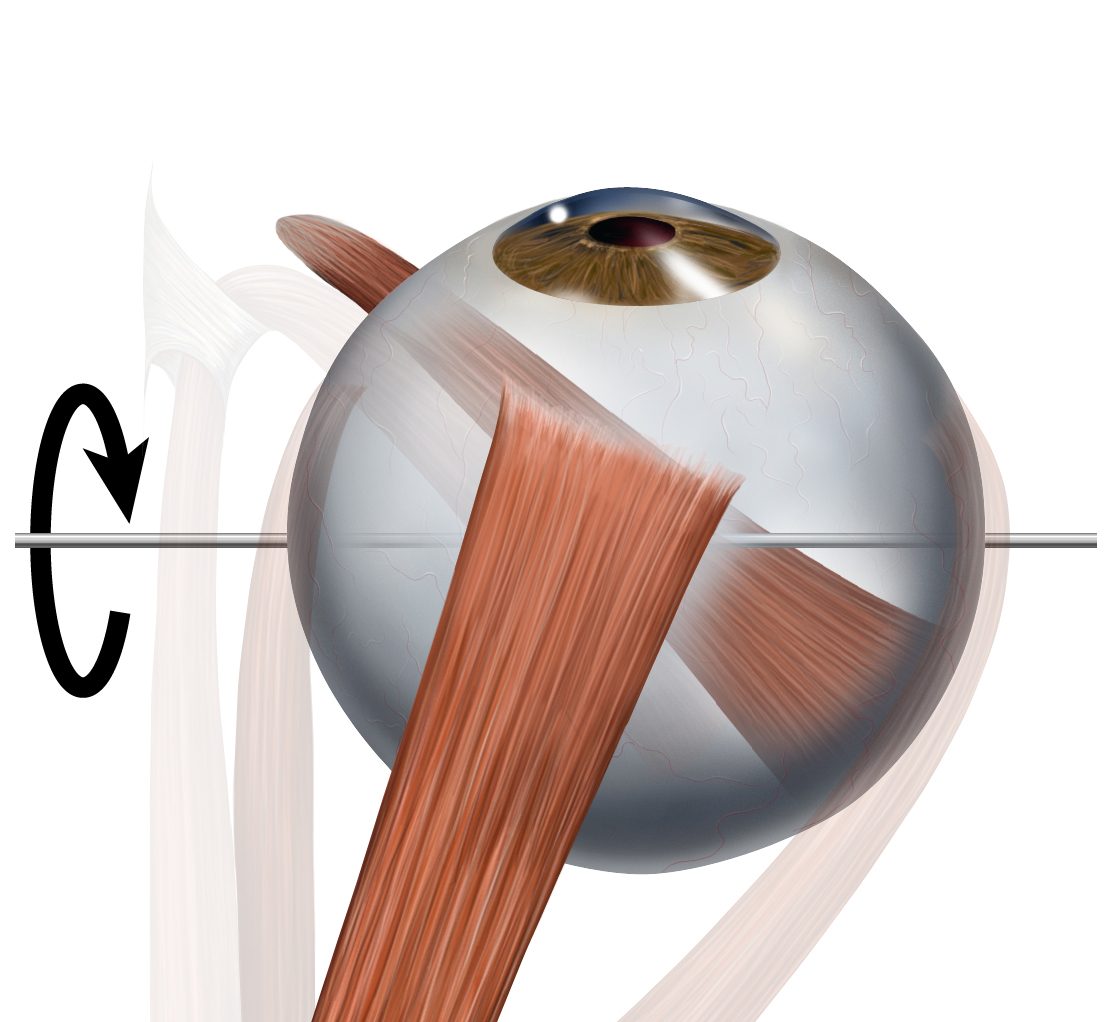
Eye movement of superior rectus muscle, superior view

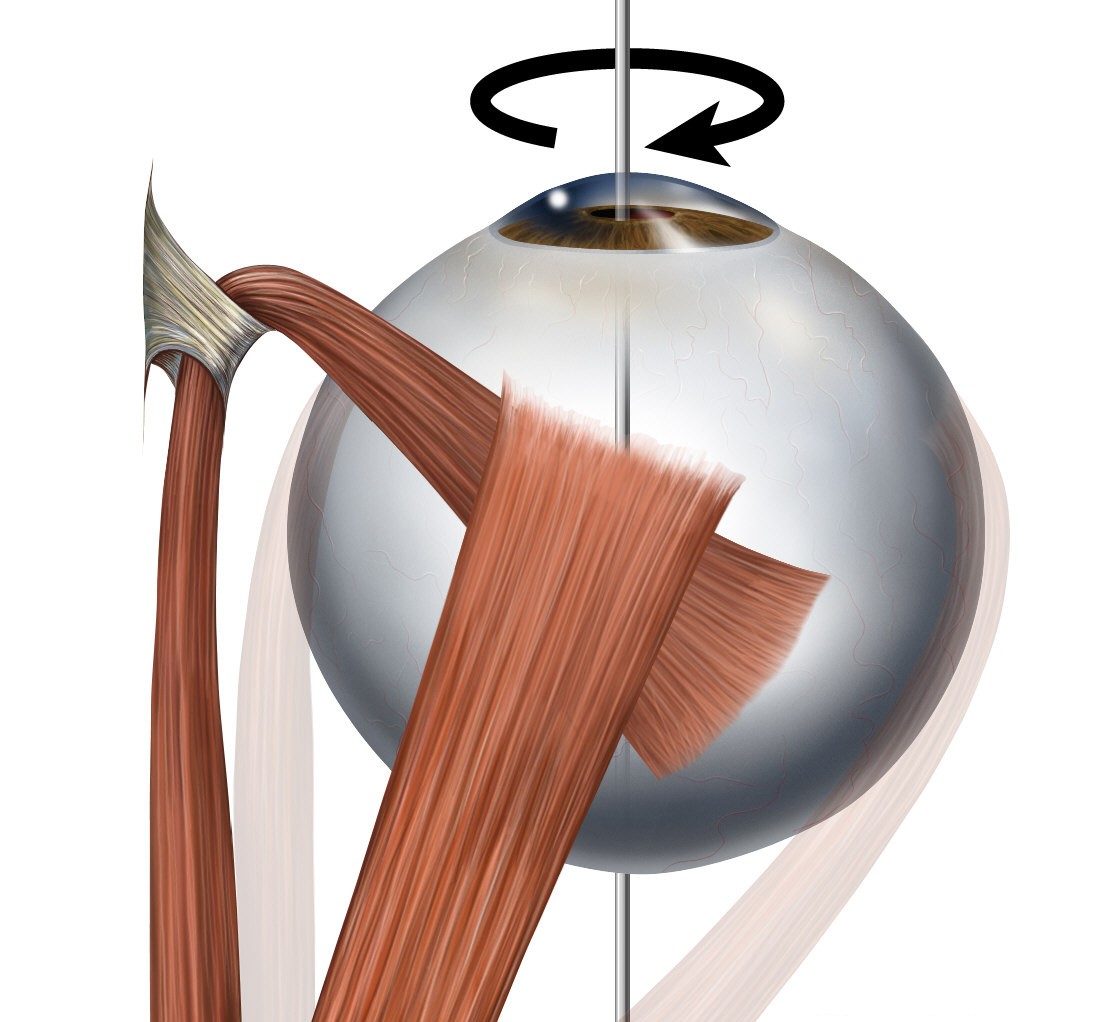
Eye movement of superior oblique muscle, superior view

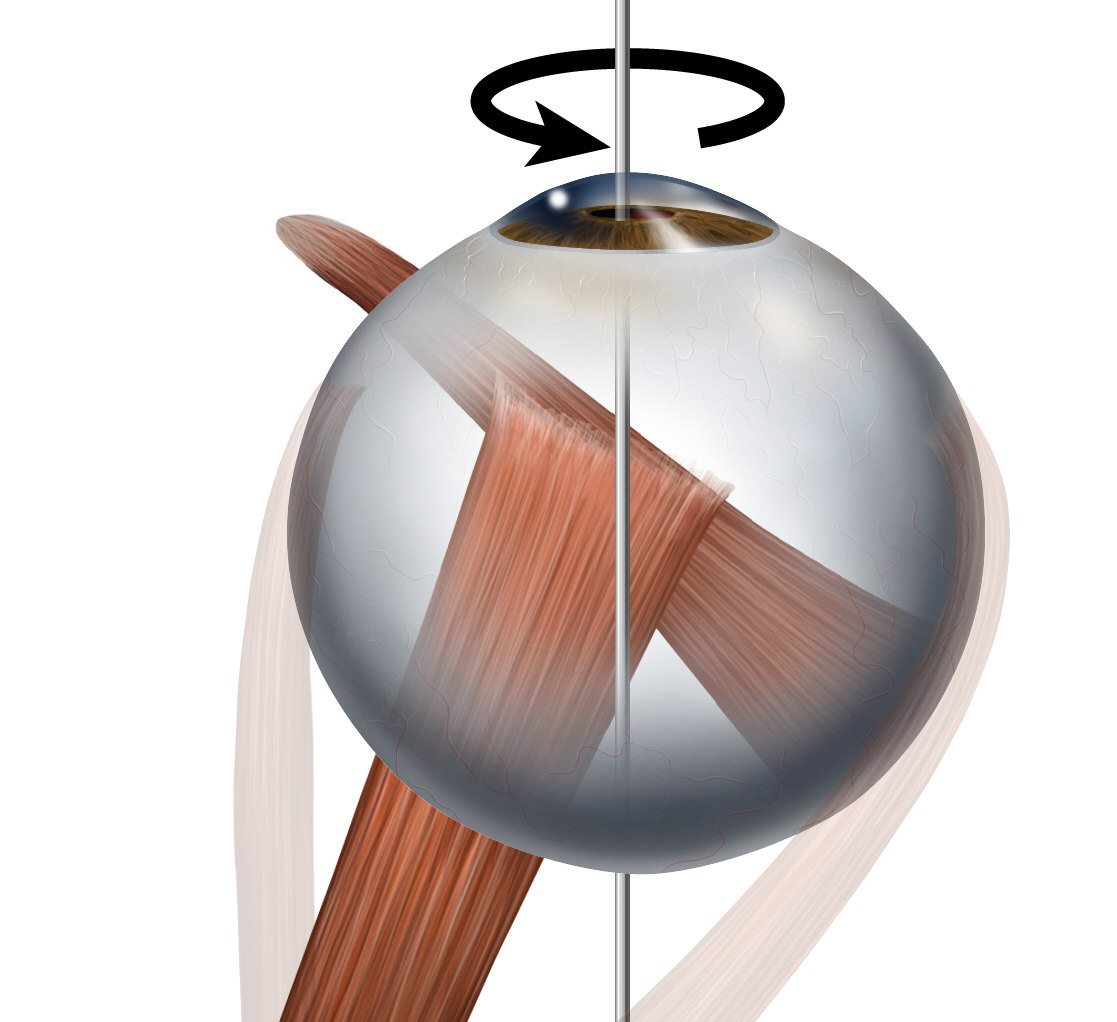
Eye movement of inferior oblique muscle, superior view

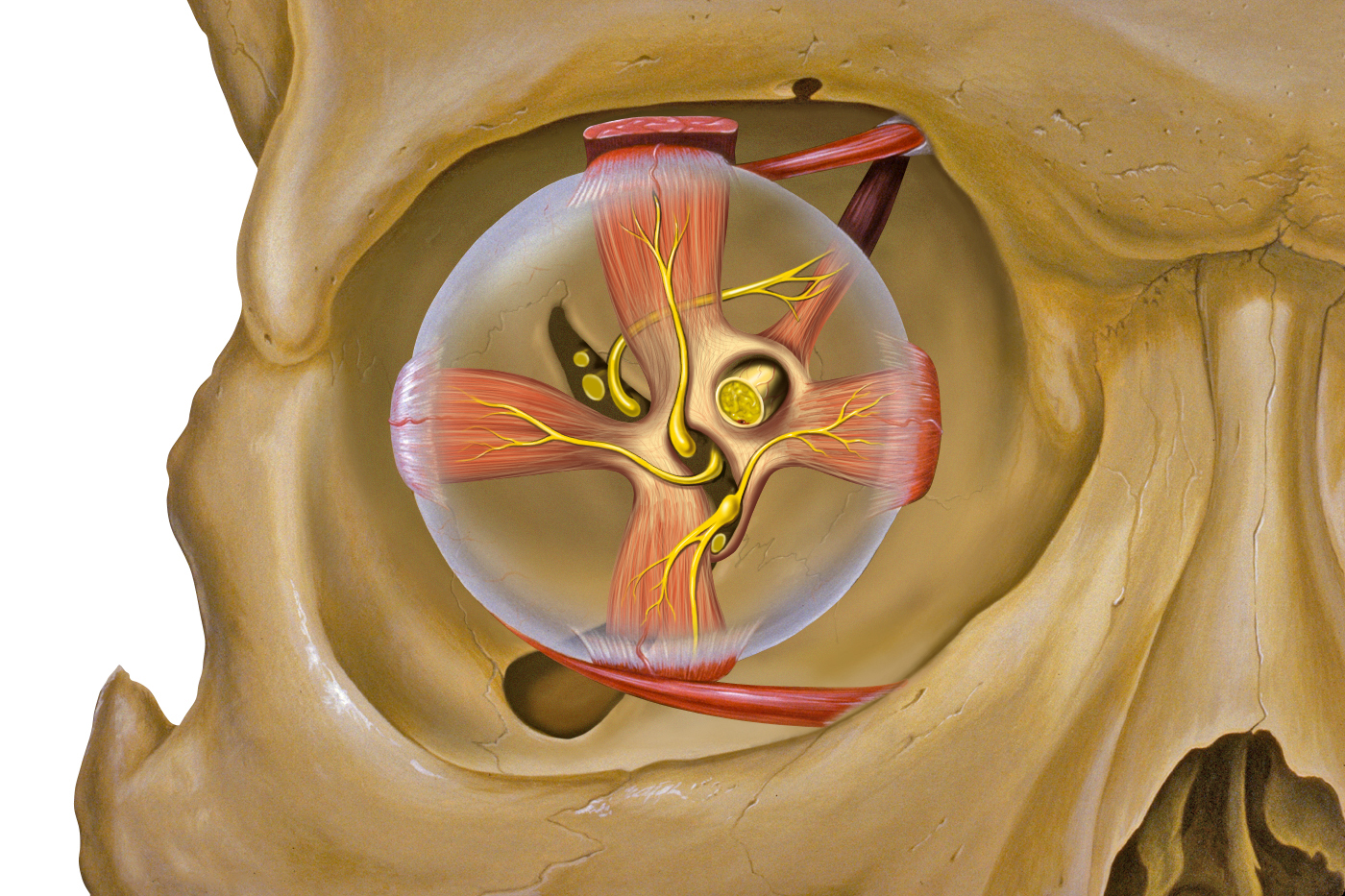
Anterior view

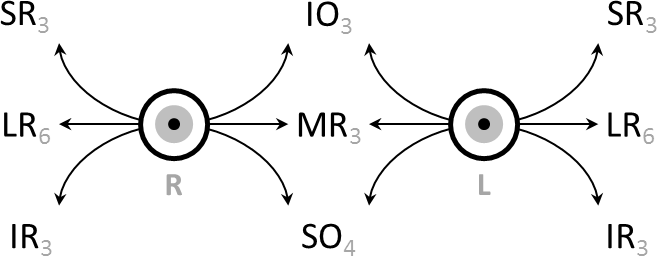
Schematic demonstrating the actions and cranial nerve innervation (in subscript) of extraocular muscles

Three antagonistic pairs of muscles control eye movement: the lateral and medial recti muscles, the superior and inferior recti muscles, and the superior and inferior oblique muscles. These muscles are responsible for movement of the eye along three different axes: horizontal, either toward the nose (adduction) or away from the nose (abduction); vertical, either elevation or depression; and torsional, movements that bring the top of the eye toward the nose (intorsion) or away from the nose (extorsion). Horizontal movement is controlled entirely by the medial and lateral recti muscles; the medial rectus muscle is responsible for adduction, the lateral rectus muscle for abduction. Vertical movement requires the coordinated action of the superior and inferior recti muscles, as well as the oblique muscles. The relative contribution of the recti and oblique groups depends on the horizontal position of the eye. In the primary position (eyes straight ahead), both of these groups contribute to vertical movement. Elevation is due to the action of the superior rectus and inferior oblique muscles, while depression is due to the action of the inferior rectus and superior oblique muscles. When the eye is abducted, the recti muscles are the prime vertical movers. Elevation is due to the action of the superior rectus, and depression is due to the action of the inferior rectus. When the eye is adducted, the oblique muscles are the prime vertical movers. Elevation is due to the action of the inferior oblique muscle, while depression is due to the action of the superior oblique muscle. The oblique muscles are also primarily responsible for torsional movement.

The muscles are supplied by the oculomotor nerve, with the exception of the superior oblique, which is supplied by the trochlear nerve, and the lateral rectus, supplied by the abducens nerve.

=== Neuroanatomy ===
The brain exerts ultimate control over both voluntary and involuntary eye movement. Three cranial nerves carry signals from the brain to control the extraocular muscles. These are the oculomotor nerve, which controls the majority of the muscles, the trochlear nerve, which controls the superior oblique muscle, and the abducens nerve, which controls the lateral rectus muscle.

In addition to the movement of muscles, numerous areas in the brain contribute to involuntary and voluntary eye movement. These include providing the conscious perception of vision, as well as areas that facilitate tracking.

- Brain
  - Cerebral cortex
    - Frontal lobe – frontal eye fields (FEF), medial eye fields (MEF), supplementary eye fields (SEF), dorsomedial frontal cortex (DMFC)
    - Parietal lobe – Lateral intraparietal cortex (LIP), middle temporal area (MT), medial superior temporal area (MST)
    - Occipital lobe
      - Visual cortex
  - Cerebellum
- Midbrain
  - Pretectal area – Pretectal nuclei
  - Superior colliculus (SC)
  - Premotor nuclei in the reticular formation (PMN)
    - riMLF
  - III, IV cranial nerve nuclei
- Pons
  - Paramedian pontine reticular formation (PMRF)
  - Nucleus prepositus hypoglossi
  - Vestibular nuclei
  - VI cranial nerve nuclei
- Medial longitudinal fasciculus

== Physiology ==
Eye movement can be classified according to two systems:

- the involvement of one or both eyes; involving one eye they may be classified as duction, and both eyes either version, if moving in the same direction, or vergence, if moving in opposite directions.
- fixational, gaze-stabilizing, or gaze-shifting. Gaze-stabilising movement may include the vestibulo-ocular reflex and optokinetic reflex, and gaze-shifting mechanisms as saccades and pursuit movements.

Vergence movement or convergence is the movement of both eyes to make sure that the image of the object being looked at falls on the corresponding spot on both retinas. This type of movement helps in the depth perception of objects.

Pursuit movement or smooth pursuit is the movement the eyes make while tracking an object's movement, so that its moving image can remain maintained on the fovea.

=== Saccades ===
The eyes are never completely at rest: they make frequent fixational eye movement even when fixated at one point. The reason for this movement is related to the photoreceptors and the ganglion cells. It appears that a constant visual stimulus can make the photoreceptors or the ganglion cells become unresponsive; on the other hand a changing stimulus will not. So the eye movement constantly changes the stimuli that fall on the photoreceptors and the ganglion cells, making the image clearer.

Saccades are the rapid movement of eyes that is used while scanning a visual scene. In our subjective impression, the eyes do not move smoothly across the printed page during reading. Instead, they make short and rapid movements called saccades. During each saccade the eyes move as fast as they can and the speed cannot be consciously controlled in between the fixations. Each movement is worth a few minutes of arc, at regular intervals about three to four per second. One of the main uses for saccades is to scan a greater area with the high-resolution fovea of the eye.

=== Vestibulo-ocular system ===
The visual system in the brain is too slow to process that information if the images are slipping across the retina at more than a few degrees per second. Thus, to be able to see while we are moving, the brain must compensate for the motion of the head by turning the eyes. Another specialisation of visual system in many vertebrate animals is the development of a small area of the retina with a very high visual acuity. This area is called the fovea, and covers about 2 degrees of visual angle in people. To get a clear view of the world, the brain must turn the eyes so that the image of the object of regard falls on the fovea. Eye movement is thus very important for visual perception, and any failure can lead to serious visual disabilities. To see a quick demonstration of this fact, try the following experiment: hold your hand up, about one foot (30 cm) in front of your nose. Keep your head still, and shake your hand from side to side, slowly at first, and then faster and faster. At first you will be able to see your fingers quite clearly. But as the frequency of shaking passes about 1 Hz, the fingers will become a blur. Now, keep your hand still, and shake your head (up and down or left and right). No matter how fast you shake your head, the image of your fingers remains clear. This demonstrates that the brain can move the eyes opposite to head motion much better than it can follow, or pursue, a hand movement. When your pursuit system fails to keep up with the moving hand, images slip on the retina and you see a blurred hand.

The brain must point both eyes accurately enough that the object of regard falls on corresponding points of the two retinas to avoid the perception of double vision. In most vertebrates (humans, mammals, reptiles, birds), the movement of different body parts is controlled by striated muscles acting around joints. The movement of the eye is slightly different in that the eyes are not rigidly attached to anything, but are held in the orbit by six extraocular muscles.

- Hering's law of equal innervation
- Sherrington's law of reciprocal innervation

== Reading ==
When reading, the eye makes short rapid movements (saccades) intermingled with short stops (fixations). There is considerable variability in fixations (the point at which a saccade jumps to) and saccades between readers and even for the same person reading a single passage of text.

=== Music reading ===
Eye movement in music reading is the scanning of a musical score by a musician's eyes. This usually occurs as the music is read during performance, although musicians sometimes scan music silently to study it, and sometimes perform from memory without score. Eye movement in music reading may at first appear to be similar to that in language reading, since in both activities the eyes move over the page in fixations and saccades, picking up and processing coded meanings. However, music is nonlinguistic and involves a strict and continuous time constraint on an output that is generated by a continuous stream of coded instructions.

== Scene viewing ==
Eye movement in scene viewing refers to the visual processing of information presented in scenes. A core aspect of studies in this area is the division of eye movements into the rapid movement of the eyes (saccades), and the focus of the eyes on a point (fixations). Several factors can influence eye movement in scene viewing, including the task and knowledge of the viewer (top-down factors), and the properties of the image being viewed (bottom-up factors). Typically, when presented with a scene, viewers demonstrate short fixation durations and long saccade amplitudes in the earlier phases of viewing an image. This is followed by longer fixations and shorter saccades in the latter phases of scene viewing processing. It has also been found that eye movement behaviour in scene viewing differs with levels of cognitive development - fixation durations are thought to shorten and saccade amplitudes lengthen with an increase in age.

=== Spatial variation ===
Where eye movements fixate is affected by both bottom-up and top-down factors. Even an initial glimpse of a scene has an influence on subsequent eye movements. In bottom-up factors, the local contrast or prominence of features in an image, such as a large contrast in luminance or a greater density of edges, can affect the guidance of eye movements. However, the top-down factors of scenes have a greater impact in where eyes fixate. Areas containing more meaningful features, or areas where colour aids the discrimination of objects, can influence eye movements. Images which are related to previous images shown can also have an effect. Eye movements can also be guided towards items when they are heard verbally at the same time as seeing them. Cross-culturally, it has been found that Westerners have an inclination to concentrate on focal objects in a scene, whereas East Asians attend more to contextual information.

=== Temporal variation ===
Average fixation durations last for about 330 ms, although there is a large variability in this approximation. This variability is mostly due to the properties of an image and in the task being carried out, which impact both bottom-up and top-down processing. The masking of an image and other degradations, such as a decrease in luminance, during fixations (factors which affect bottom-up processing), have been found to increase the length of fixation durations. However, an enhancement of the image with these factors also increases fixation durations. Factors which affect top-down processing (e.g. blurring) have been found to both increase and decrease fixation durations.

== Disorders ==
=== Symptoms ===
- Patients with eye movement disorders may report diplopia, nystagmus, poor visual acuity or cosmetic blemish from squint of the eyes.

=== Cause ===
- Innervational
  - Supranuclear
  - Nuclear
  - Nerve
  - Synapse
- Muscle anomalies
  - Maldevelopment (e.g. Hypertrophy, atrophy/dystrophy)
  - Malinsertion
  - Scarring secondary to alignment surgery
  - Muscle diseases (e.g. Myasthenia gravis)
- Orbital anomalies
  - Tumor (e.g. rhabdomyosarcoma)
  - Excess fat behind globe (e.g. thyroid conditions)
  - Bone fracture
  - Check ligament (e.g. Brown's syndrome, or Superior tendon sheath syndrome)

=== Selected disorders ===
- Congenital fourth nerve palsy
- Duane syndrome
- Internuclear ophthalmoplegia
- Nystagmus
- Ophthalmoparesis
- Opsoclonus
- Sixth (abducent) nerve palsy

== Terminology ==
The following terms may be used to describe eye movement:

- Incyclotorsion is a term applied to the inward, torsional (rotational) movement of the eye, mediated by the superior oblique muscle of the eye. The superior oblique muscle is innervated by cranial nerve IV (trochlear nerve). Incyclotorsion may also be used to describe one part of the condition of the eye when a patient has an oculomotor nerve palsy. The oculomotor nerve (cranial nerve III) supplies the inferior oblique muscle (along with four other eye muscles – superior rectus, medial rectus, inferior rectus and the striated muscle of levator palpebrae superioris), and when this muscle is non-functional (as in oculomotor palsy) the eye incyclotorts; i.e. twists/rotates inward.
- Excyclotorsion is a term applied to the outward, torsional (rotational) movement of the eye, mediated by the inferior oblique muscle of the eye. The inferior oblique muscle is innervated by cranial nerve III (oculomotor nerve). Excyclotorsion may also be used to describe the condition or state of the eye when a patient has a cranial nerve IV (trochlear nerve) palsy. The trochlear nerve supplies the superior oblique muscle, and when this muscle is non-functional (as in trochlear palsy) the eye excyclotorts; i.e. twists/rotates outward. This excyclotorsion may be corrected through surgery using the Harada-Ito procedure.
- A version is an eye movement involving both eyes moving synchronously and symmetrically in the same direction. Examples include:
1. Dextroversion / right gaze
2. Laevoversion / left gaze
3. Sursumversion / elevation / up gaze
4. Deorsumversion / depression / down gaze
5. Dextroelevation / gaze up and right
6. Dextrodepression / gaze down and right
7. Laevoelevation / gaze up and left
8. Laevodepression / gaze down and left
9. Dextrocycloversion – top of the eye rotates to the right
10. Laevocycloversion – top of the eye rotates to the left

== See also ==
- Accommodation (eye)
- Convergence micropsia
- Dissociated vertical deviation
- Eye tracking
- Gaze-contingency paradigm
- Listing's law
- Microsaccade
- Ocular tremor
- Orthoptist
- Oculesics
- Strabismus
- Progressive supranuclear palsy
- Computer processing of body language
