= Ocular tremor =

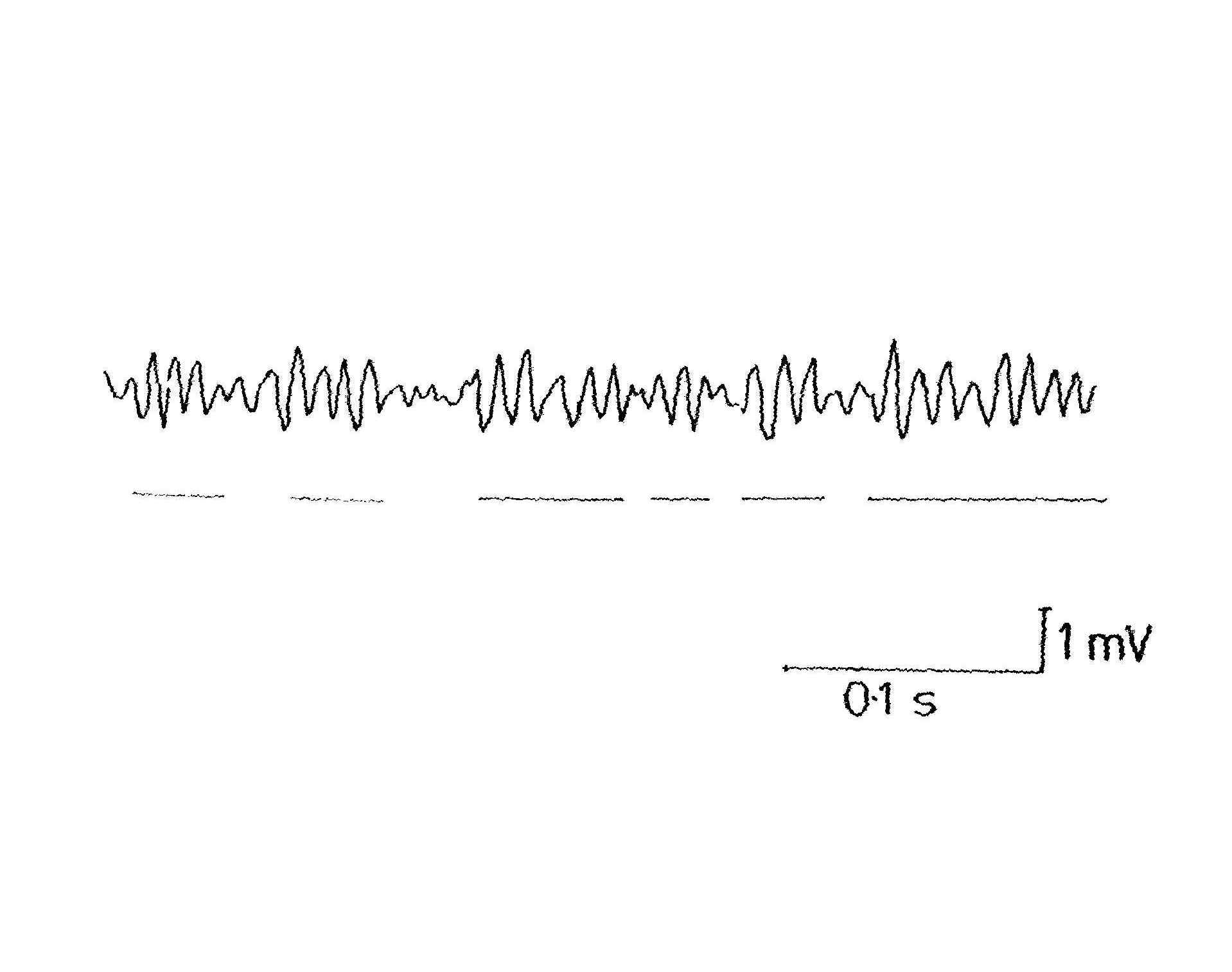
Ocular microtremor tracing with burst sections underlined

Ocular tremor (ocular microtremor) is a constant, involuntary eye tremor of a low amplitude and high frequency. It is a type of fixational eye movement that occurs in all normal people, even when the eye appears still. The frequency of ocular microtremor has been found to range from 30 Hz to 103 Hz, and the amplitude is approximately four thousandths of a degree.

== Cause ==
Human eyes are constantly moving, even if they appear to be focused on an object. These constant oscillations are called fixational eye movements, and they include ocular microtremor, microsaccades, and drift. Ocular tremor is the smallest of these movements, and it often overlaps with drift. This makes it the most difficult fixational eye movement to measure. Due to these difficulties in measurement, fewer studies have been performed on ocular microtremor, leading to the phenomenon of ocular tremor not being well-understood.

Researchers are not entirely sure of the cause of ocular microtremor. It may be a result from the firing of motor neurons at different times. It has also been suggested that ocular tremor is a result of the eye being balanced between opposing muscles.

== Size and measurement ==
Ocular microtremor is smaller than the other fixational eye movements of microsaccades and drift. It occurs between microsaccades, during the same time intervals as drift. The measured frequency and amplitude of ocular tremor have been found to vary. The frequency typically falls between 30 Hz and 103 Hz, while the amplitude has been measured to be approximately four thousandths of a degree.

Specific tools, known as piezoelectric probes or piezoelectric strain gauges, are commonly used to measure ocular microtremor. A local anesthetic is used for both of these invasive methods, because contact with the sclera is required. While non-contact methods of measuring ocular tremor have been found, they are not typically used due to their low resolution.

== See also ==
- Eye movements
- Fixational eye movements
- Human eye
- Visual perception
- Piezoelectric sensor
