= Fourth nerve palsy =

Fourth Cranial Nerve Palsy
- Other names: Trochlear nerve palsy
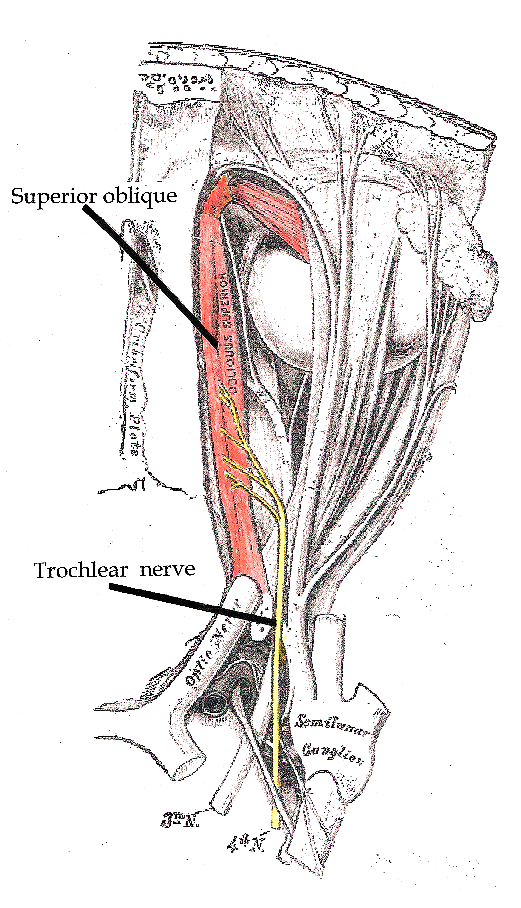
- Trochlear nerve
- Specialty: Ophthalmology

Fourth cranial nerve palsy or trochlear nerve palsy, is a condition affecting cranial nerve 4 (IV), the trochlear nerve, which is one of the cranial nerves. It causes weakness or paralysis of the superior oblique muscle that it innervates. This condition often causes vertical or near vertical double vision as the weakened muscle prevents the eyes from moving in the same direction together.

Because the trochlear nerve is the thinnest and has the longest intracranial course of the cranial nerves, it is particularly vulnerable to traumatic injury.

To compensate for the double-vision resulting from the weakness of the superior oblique, patients characteristically tilt their head down and to the side opposite the affected muscle.

When present at birth, it is known as congenital fourth nerve palsy.

== See also ==
- Harada–Ito procedure
