= Harada–Ito procedure =

Eye muscle operation

- ICD-9-CM: 15

The Harada–Ito procedure is an eye muscle operation designed to improve the excyclotorsion experienced by some patients with cranial nerve IV palsy. In this procedure, the superior oblique tendon is split, and the anterior fibers – the fibers most responsible for incyclotorsion – are moved anteriorly and laterally. This selectively stretches and tightens these fibers, enhancing the incyclotorsion power of the superior oblique.

The most common indication for the Harada–Ito procedure is bilateral acquired cranial nerve IV palsy following closed head trauma (particularly automobile accidents). In this clinical situation the vertical imbalance is often less symptomatically bothersome to the patient than the induced excyclotorsion. Affected patients have a particularly annoying type of double vision (diplopia), wherein the images are twisted (excyclotorted).Patients with cranial nerve IV palsy whose complaints are not specifically limited to torsional diplopia, but instead also have significant vertical diplopia, are not good candidates for a Harada–Ito procedure. Instead, a recession of the inferior oblique muscle, or another strabismus operation may be indicated.

== See also ==
- Eye surgery
