= Optocollic reflex =

Gaze stabilization reflex in birds

Optocollic reflex is a gaze stabilization reflex that occurs in birds in response to visual (optokinetic) inputs, and leads to head movements that compensate for passive displacements and rotations of the animal. The reflex seems to be more prominent when the bird is flying (or at least held in a "flying position"). The brain systems involved in the reflex are the nucleus of the basal optic roots, the pretectal nucleus lentiformis mesencephali, the vestibular nuclei, and the cerebellum
