= Frontal eye fields =

Region of the frontal cortex of the brain

Frontal eye field
- Frontal eye field is roughly located between regions #4, #6, and #8

Details
- Part of: Frontal cortex
- System: Visual system

Brodmann area 8

The frontal eye fields (FEF) are a region located in the frontal cortex, more specifically in Brodmann area 8 or BA8, of the primate brain. In humans, it can be more accurately said to lie in a region around the intersection of the middle frontal gyrus with the precentral gyrus, consisting of a frontal and parietal portion. The FEF is responsible for saccadic eye movements for the purpose of visual field perception and awareness, as well as for voluntary eye movement. The FEF communicates with extraocular muscles indirectly via the paramedian pontine reticular formation. Destruction of the FEF causes deviation of the eyes to the ipsilateral side.

== Function ==
The cortical area called the frontal eye field (FEF) plays an important role in the control of visual attention and eye movements. Electrical stimulation in the FEF elicits saccadic eye movements. The FEF have a topographic structure and represents saccade targets in retinotopic coordinates.

The frontal eye field is reported to be activated during the initiation of eye movements, such as voluntary saccades and pursuit eye movements. There is also evidence that it plays a role in purely sensory processing and that it belongs to a “fast brain” system through a superior colliculus – medial dorsal nucleus – FEF ascending pathway.

In humans, its earliest activations in regard to visual stimuli occur at 45 ms with activations related to changes in visual stimuli within 45–60 ms (these are comparable with response times in the primary visual cortex). This fast brain pathway also provides auditory input at even shorter times starting at 24 ms and being affected by auditory characteristics at 30–60 ms.

The FEF constitutes together with the supplementary eye fields (SEF), the intraparietal sulcus (IPS) and the superior colliculus (SC) one of the most important brain areas involved in the generation and control of eye movements, particularly in the direction contralateral to the frontal eye fields' location. In addition, FEF has an important role in the covert allocation of spatial attention through its reciprocal connectivity with visual cortex.

== Clinical significance ==
=== Lesions ===
Unilateral irritative stimulation of a FEF, such as a frontal seizure causes conjugate gaze contralateral to the stimulation. Conversely, a unilateral destructive lesion of the FEF causes conjugate gaze towards the lesion.

== See also ==
- Saccade
- Smooth pursuit
- Supplementary eye fields
- IPS / LIP
- Dorsal attention network (primarily frontal eye fields and intrapareital sulcus)
