= Smooth pursuit =

Type of eye movement used for closely following a moving object

Predictive smooth pursuit for a sinusoidal target movement

In the scientific study of vision, smooth pursuit describes a type of eye movement in which the eyes remain fixated on a moving object. It is one of two ways that visual animals can voluntarily shift gaze, the other being saccadic eye movements. Pursuit differs from the vestibulo-ocular reflex, which only occurs during movements of the head and serves to stabilize gaze on a stationary object. Most people are unable to initiate pursuit without a moving visual signal. The pursuit of targets moving with velocities of greater than 30°/s tends to require catch-up saccades. Smooth pursuit is asymmetric: most humans and primates tend to be better at horizontal than vertical smooth pursuit, as defined by their ability to pursue smoothly without making catch-up saccades. Most humans are also better at downward than upward pursuit. Pursuit is modified by ongoing visual feedback.

== Measurement ==
There are two basic methods for recording smooth pursuit eye movements, and eye movement in general. The first is with a search coil. This technique is most common in primate research, and is extremely accurate. An eye movement shifts the orientation of the coil to induce an electric current, which is translated into horizontal and vertical eye position. The second technique is an eye tracker. This device, while somewhat more noisy, is non-invasive and is often used in human psychophysics and recently also in instructional psychology. It relies on the infrared illumination of the pupil to track eye position with a camera.

During oculomotor experiments, it is often important to ensure that no saccades occurred when the subject was supposed to be smoothly pursuing a target. Such eye movements are called catch-up saccades and are more common when pursuing at high speeds. Researchers are able to discard portions of eye movement recordings that contain saccades, in order to analyze the two components separately. Saccadic eye movements differ from the smooth pursuit component by their very high initial acceleration and deceleration, and peak velocity.

== Neural circuitry ==
The neural circuitry underlying smooth pursuit is an object of debate. The first step towards the initiation of pursuit is to see a moving target. Signals from the retina ascend through the lateral geniculate nucleus and activate neurons in primary visual cortex. Primary visual cortex sends the information about the target to the middle temporal visual cortex, which responds very selectively to directions of movement. The processing of motion in this area is necessary for smooth pursuit responses. This sensory area provides the motion signal, which may or may not be smoothly pursued. A region of cortex in the frontal lobe, known as the frontal pursuit area, responds to particular vectors of pursuit, and can be electrically stimulated to induce pursuit movements. Recent evidence suggests that the superior colliculus also responds during smooth pursuit eye movement. These two areas are likely involved in providing the "go"-signal to initiate pursuit, as well as selecting which target to track. The "go"-signal from the cortex and the superior colliculus is relayed to several pontine nuclei, including the dorsolateral pontine nuclei and the nucleus reticularis tegmenti pontis. The neurons of the pons are tuned to eye velocity and are directionally selective, and can be stimulated to change the velocity of pursuit. The pontine nuclei project to the cerebellum, specifically the vermis and the paraflocculus. These neurons code for the target velocity and are responsible for the particular velocity profile of pursuit. The cerebellum, especially the vestibulo-cerebellum, is also involved in the online correction of velocity during pursuit. The cerebellum then projects to optic motoneurons, which control the eye muscles and cause the eye to move.

== Stages of smooth pursuit ==
Pursuit eye movement can be divided into two stages: open-loop pursuit and closed-loop pursuit. Open-loop pursuit is the visual system's first response to a moving object we want to track and typically lasts ~100 ms. Therefore, this stage is ballistic: Visual signals have not yet had time to correct the ongoing pursuit velocity or direction. The second stage of pursuit, closed-loop pursuit, lasts until the pursuit movement has ceased. This stage is characterized by the online correction of pursuit velocity to compensate for retinal slip. In other words, the pursuit system tries to null retinal velocity of the object of interest. This is achieved at the end of the open-loop phase. In the closed-loop phase, the eye angular velocity and target angular velocity are nearly equal.

== Smooth pursuit and spatial attention ==
Various lines of research suggests a tight coupling for closed loop pursuit and spatial attention. For instance, during the close loop phase selective attention is coupled to the pursuit target such that untracked targets which move in the same direction with the target are poorly processed by the visual system. Recently, a loose coupling of open loop pursuit and attention was suggested, when there is only one possible moving target. This difference between pursuit and saccades may be accounted for by the differences in latency. Pursuit eye movements are initiated within 90-150 ms, while typical latencies for voluntary saccades are in the order of 200-250 ms

== Smooth pursuit in the absence of a visual target ==
Performing smooth pursuit without a moving visual stimulus is difficult, and typically results in a series of saccades. However, pursuit without a visible target is possible under some particular conditions, that show the importance of high-level functions in smooth pursuit maintenance.

If you know which way a target will move, or know the target trajectory (because it is periodic for instance), you can initiate pursuit before the target motion actually starts, especially if you know exactly when the motion will start. It is also possible to maintain pursuit if a target momentarily disappears, especially if the target appears to be occluded by a larger object.

Under conditions in which there is no visual stimulation (in total darkness), we can still perform smooth pursuit eye movements with the help of a proprioceptive motion signal (e.g. your moving finger).

=== Following stimuli from peripheral gaze ===
When a bright light appears in the periphery, the fastest it can achieve a smooth pursuit is 30°/second. It first fixes the gaze to the peripheral light, and if not in excess of 30°/second, will follow the target equally with the movement. At higher velocities, the eye will not move smoothly, and requires corrective saccades. Unlike saccades, this process uses a continuous feedback system, which is based strictly on error.

== Distinction between smooth pursuit, optokinetic nystagmus, and ocular following response ==
Although we can clearly separate smooth pursuit from the vestibulo-ocular reflex, we can not always draw a clear separation between smooth pursuit and other tracking eye movements like the slow phase of the optokinetic nystagmus and the ocular following response (OFR), discovered in 1986 by Miles, Kawano, and Optican, which is a transient ocular tracking response to full-field motion. The latter are both slow eye movements in response to extended targets, with the purpose of stabilizing the image. Therefore, some processing stages are shared with the smooth pursuit system. Those different kinds of eye movements may not be simply differentiated by the stimulus that is appropriate to generate them, as smooth pursuit eye movements can be generated to track extended targets as well. The main difference may lie in the voluntary nature of pursuit eye movements.

== Smooth-pursuit deficits ==
Smooth pursuit requires the coordination of many brain regions that are far away from each other. This makes it particularly susceptible to impairment from a variety of disorders and conditions.

=== Schizophrenia ===
There is significant evidence that smooth pursuit is deficient in people with schizophrenia and their relatives. People with schizophrenia tend to have trouble pursuing very fast targets. This impairment is correlated with less activation in areas known to play a role in pursuit, such as the frontal eye field. However, other studies have shown that people with schizophrenia show relatively normal pursuit, compared to controls, when tracking objects that move unexpectedly. The greatest deficits are when the patients track objects of a predictable velocity which begin moving at a predictable time. This study speculates that smooth pursuit deficits in schizophrenia are a function of the patients' inability to store motion vectors.

=== Autism ===
People with autism show a plethora of visual deficits. One such deficit is to smooth pursuit. Children with autism show reduced velocity of smooth pursuit compared to controls during ongoing tracking. However, the latency of the pursuit response is similar to controls. This deficit appears to only emerge after middle adolescence.

=== Trauma ===
People with post traumatic stress disorder, with secondary psychotic symptoms, show pursuit deficits. These patients tend to have trouble maintaining pursuit velocity above 30 degree/second. A correlation has also been found between performance on tracking tasks and a childhood history of physical and emotional abuse.

=== Drugs and Alcohol ===
"Lack of Smooth Pursuit" is a scorable clue on the NHTSA's standardized field sobriety tests. The clue, in combination with others, may be used to determine if a person is impaired by alcohol and/or drugs. Drugs causing lack of smooth pursuit include depressants, some inhalants, and dissociative anesthetics (such as phencyclidine or ketamine).

=== Preterm Birth ===
Children born very preterm show smooth pursuit deficits compared to paired controls born at full term. This delay in smooth pursuit has also been linked to later neurodevelopment in toddlerhood in children born very preterm.

== See also ==
- Eye movement
- Eye tracking
- Frontal eye fields
- Microsaccade
- Saccade
- Superior colliculus
- Endophenotype
