= Fixation (visual) =

Maintaining one's gaze on a single location

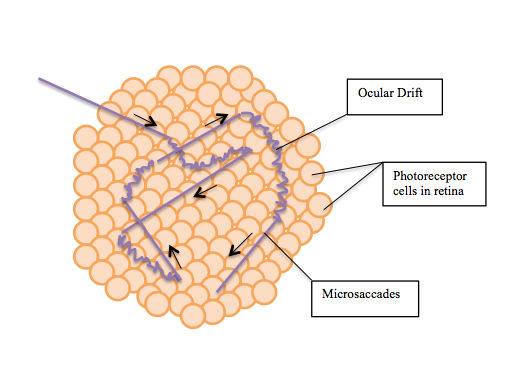
Microsaccades and Ocular Drifts

Fixation, also known as visual fixation, is the maintaining of the gaze on a single location. An animal can exhibit visual fixation if it possesses a fovea in the anatomy of their eye. The fovea is typically located at the center of the retina and is the point of clearest vision. The species in which fixational eye movement has been verified thus far include humans, primates, cats, rabbits, turtles, salamanders, and owls. Regular eye movement alternates between saccades and visual fixations, the notable exception being in smooth pursuit, controlled by a different neural substrate that appears to have developed for hunting prey. The term "fixation" can either be used to refer to the point in time and space of focus (the focal point, in optical terms) or the act of fixating. Fixation, in the act of fixating, is the point between any two saccades, during which the eyes are relatively stationary and virtually all visual input occurs. In the absence of retinal jitter, a laboratory condition known as retinal stabilization, perceptions tend to rapidly pass away. To maintain visibility, the nervous system carries out a procedure called fixational eye movement, which continuously stimulates neurons in the early visual areas of the brain responding to transient stimuli. There are three categories of fixational eye movement: microsaccades, ocular drifts, and ocular microtremor. At small amplitudes the boundaries between categories become unclear, particularly between drift and tremor.

== History ==
In 1738, James Jurin made the first known reference to a "trembling of the eye" that was presumably caused by fixational eye movements. Robert Darwin noted in 1786 that the jiggling of color after-effects was presumably the consequence of small eye movements. Eye tracking with sufficient resolution to record fixational eye movements was developed in the 1950s. Retinal stabilization, the ability to project stabilized images on the retina, showed that retinal motion was necessary for visual perception, also in the 1950s. The field remained quiet until the 2000s, when key neurological properties of fixational eye movement were discovered and a new wave of research began.

== Microsaccades ==
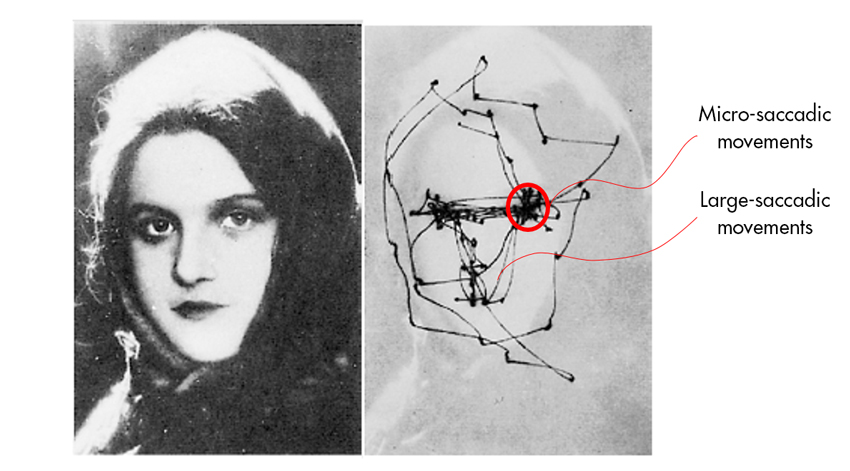
The lines on the right image show the saccadic and microsaccadic movements of a person's eye while looking at the face in the left image. The involuntary, micro-saccadic movement is not steady when the person's eyes are concentrated at the eyes of the woman, while the voluntary, saccadic movement goes around the periphery of the face once at any give point.

A microsaccade, also known as a "flick", is a type of saccade. Microsaccades are the largest and fastest of the fixational eye movements. Like saccades in general, microsaccades are usually binocular, and conjugate movements with comparable amplitudes and directions in both eyes. However, the definition of microsaccade varies from study to study and no common definition has emerged.

In the 1960s, scientists suggested the maximum amplitude for microsaccades should be 12 arcminutes to distinguish microsaccades and saccades. However, further studies have shown that microsaccades can certainly exceed this value. Newer studies have used a threshold of up to 2° to categorize microsaccades, expanding the definition by an order of magnitude. The distribution of saccade amplitudes is unimodal, giving no empirical threshold to distinguish microsaccades and saccades. Poletti et al. propose using a threshold based on the amplitude of sustained fixations and give a cutoff of 30 arcminutes or 0.5 degrees.

Another way to distinguish microsaccades from saccades is by the intention of the subject when they happen. By this definition regular saccades are produced during the active and intentional exploration of the eye, during non-fixation tasks such as free viewing or visual search. Microsaccades are defined as the "involuntary saccades that occur spontaneously during intended fixation". The subjectivity of this definition has drawn criticism.

=== Mechanism ===
Moving in a straight-line-fashion, microsaccades have the ability to carry the retinal image from several dozen to several hundred photoreceptor widths. Because they shift the retinal image, microsaccades overcome adaption and generate neural responses to stationary stimuli in visual neurons. These movements might serve the function of maintaining visibility during fixation, or might be related to attentional shifts to objects in the visual field or in memory, might help limit binocular fixation disparity, or may serve some combination of those functions.

=== Medical application ===
Some neuroscientists believe that microsaccades are potentially important in neurological and ophthalmic diseases since they are strongly related to many features of visual perception, attention, and cognition. Research aimed at finding the purpose of microsaccades began in the 1990s. The development of non-invasive eye-movement-recording devices, the ability to record single-neuron activity in monkeys, and the use of computational processing power in the analysis of dynamic behavior led to advancements in microsaccade research. Today, there is growing interest in research on microsaccades. Research on microsaccades includes investigating the perceptual effects of microsaccades, recording the neural responses they induce, and tracking the mechanisms behind their oculomotor generation. It has been shown that when fixation is not explicitly enforced as it often occurs in vision research experiments, microsaccades precisely shift gaze to nearby locations of interest. This behavior compensates for non-uniform vision within the foveola.

Some studies suggest the use of microsaccades as a diagnostic method for ADHD. Adults diagnosed with ADHD but with no medication treatments tend to blink more and make more microsaccades. Microsaccades are also being explored as diagnostic measures for Progressive supranuclear palsy, Alzheimer's disease, autism spectrum disorder, acute hypoxia, and other conditions.

== Ocular drifts ==
Ocular drift is the fixational eye movement characterized by a smoother, slower, roaming motion of the eye when fixed on an object. The exact movement of ocular drift is often compared to Brownian motion, which is the random motion of a particle suspended in fluid as a result of its collision with the atoms and molecules that comprise that fluid. The movement can also be compared to a random walk, characterized by random and often erratic changes in direction. Ocular drifts occur incessantly during intersaccadic fixation. Although the frequency of ocular drifts is usually lower than the frequency of ocular microtremors (from 0 to 40 Hz compared to from 40 to 100 Hz), it is problematic to distinguish ocular drifts and ocular microtremors. In fact, microtremors might reflect the Brownian engine underlying the drift motion. Resolution of intersaccadic eye movements is technically challenging.

Brownian Motion

=== Mechanism ===
The motion of ocular drift is related to the processing and encoding of space and time. It is also related to acquiring minute visual details of objects that are stationary, in order for these details to be further processed. Recent results have shown that ocular drift reformats the input signal to the retina equalizing (whitening) spatial power at non-zero temporal frequencies across a broad spatial frequency range.

=== Medical application ===
Ocular drift of one type was first found to be caused by an instability of the ocular motor system. However, more recent findings suggest that there are actually a number of hypotheses as to why ocular drifts occur. First, ocular drifts can be caused by the uncontrollable random movements driven by neuronal or muscular noise. Second, ocular drifts can occur to counter controlled motor variables, namely a faulty motor negative feedback loop. When the head is not immobilized, as in daily life and as is often true in eye movement recordings in the laboratory, ocular drifts compensate for the natural fixational instability of the head. Ocular drifts are altered by some neurologic conditions including Tourette syndrome and autism spectrum disorder

== Ocular microtremors ==
Ocular microtremors (OMTs) are small, quick, and synchronized oscillations of the eyes occurring at frequencies in a range of 40 to 100 Hz, although they typically occur at around 90 Hz in the average healthy individual. They are characterized by their high frequency and minuscule amplitude of just a few arcseconds. Although the function of ocular microtremors is debatable and not fully known, they seem to play a role in processing of high spatial frequencies, which allows for perception of fine detail. Studies show that ocular microtremors have some promise as a tool for determining the level of consciousness in an individual, as well as the progression of some degenerative diseases including Parkinson's disease and multiple sclerosis.

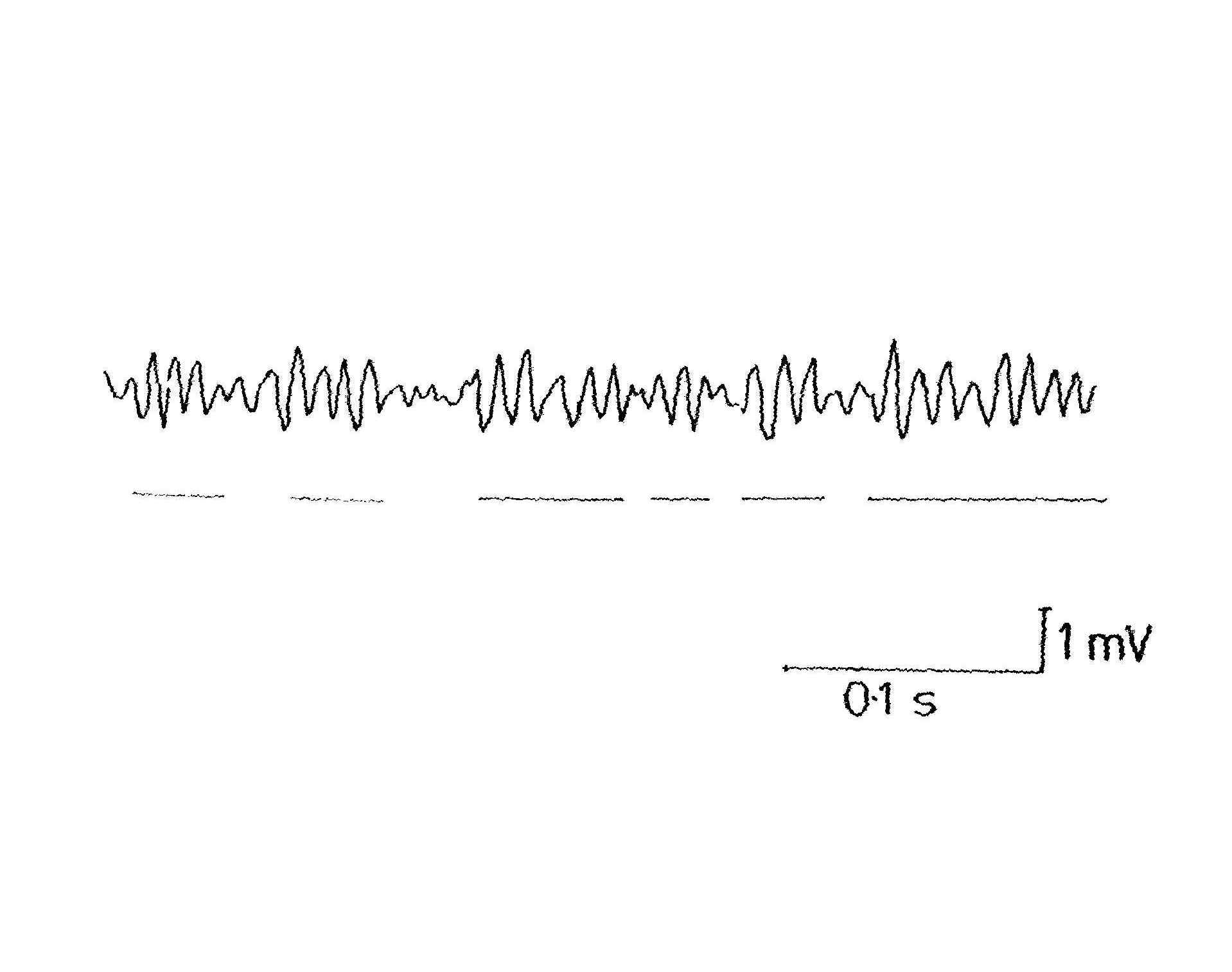
Ocular microtremor tracing with burst sections underlined

=== Mechanism ===
Although originally thought to stem from spontaneous firing of motor units, the origin of ocular microtremors is now believed to be in the oculomotor nuclei in the reticular formation of the brainstem. This new insight opened the possibility of using ocular tremors as a gauge for neuronal activity in that region of the central nervous system. More research must be done, but recent studies strongly suggest that decreased activity in the brainstem correlates with decreased frequency of OMTs.

=== Medical application ===
Several methods of recording have been developed to observe these minuscule events, the most successful being the piezoelectric strain gauge method, which translates eye movement through a latex probe in contact with the eye leading to piezoelectric strain gauge. This method is used in research settings; more practical adaptations of this technology have been developed for use in clinical settings to monitor the depth of anesthesia. Despite the availability of these methods, tremor remains more difficult to measure than other fixational eye movements, and studies addressing medical applications of tremor movements are rare as a result. Some studies have, nevertheless, pointed to the possibility that tremor movements may be useful in assessing the progression of degenerative diseases including Parkinson's disease and multiple sclerosis.

== See also ==
- Rapid eye movement
- Microsaccade
- Ocular tremor
- Saccade
