= Optokinetic response =

Reflexive movement of eyes in the direction of motion to reduce motion blur

Horizontal optokinetic nystagmus

The optokinetic reflex (OKR), also referred to as the optokinetic response, or optokinetic nystagmus (OKN), is a compensatory reflex that supports visual image stabilization. The purpose of OKR is to prevent motion blur on the retina that would otherwise occur when an animal moves its head or navigates through its environment. This is achieved by the reflexive movement of the eyes in the same direction as image motion, so as to minimize the relative motion of the visual scene on the eye. OKR is best evoked by slow, rotational motion, and operates in coordination with several complementary reflexes that also support image stabilization, including the vestibulo-ocular reflex (VOR).

== Characteristics of OKR ==
=== Eliciting OKR ===
OKR is typically evoked by presenting full field visual motion to a subject. The optokinetic drum is a common clinic tool used for this purpose. The drum most commonly contains sinusoidal or square-wave stripes that move across the subject's field of view to elicit strong optokinetic eye movements. However, nearly any moving texture evokes OKR in mammals. Outside of laboratory settings, OKR is strongly evoked by natural image motion, including when looking out the side window of a moving vehicle.

=== Eye movement patterns ===
When viewing constant, unidirectional motion, OKR consists of a stereotyped "sawtooth" waveform that represents two types of eye movements. During slow nystagmus, the eyes smoothly follow the direction of the stimulus. Though slow nystagmus closely resembles smooth pursuit eye movements, it is distinct; several species that do not exhibit smooth pursuit nonetheless have slow nystagmus during OKR (though in humans, it is possible to substitute slow nystagmus for smooth pursuit during a version of OKR referred to as "look nystagmus", in which subjects are specifically instructed to track the moving stimuli). Fast nystagmus is the second constituent eye movement in OKR. It consists of a rapid, resetting saccade in the opposite direction of the slow nystagmus (i.e., opposite to the stimulus motion). The purpose of the fast nystagmus is to keep the eye centered in the orbit, while the purpose of the slow nystagmus is to stabilize the moving visual scene on the retina.

== Comparative biology ==
OKR is one of the best preserved behaviors in the animal kingdom. It has been identified in insects, invertebrates, reptiles, amphibians, birds, fish, and all mammals. There are subtle differences in how OKR plays out across species. For instance, in fruit flies, individual segments of the compound eye move in response to image motion, whereas in mammals and several other species the entire eye moves together. In addition, OKR patterns vary across species according to whether stimuli are presented monocularly or binocularly: in most species monocular presentation of stimuli results in asymmetric responses, with stimuli moving in the nasal-to-temporal direction resulting in larger responses than stimuli moving in the temporal-to-nasal direction. In humans, this asymmetry is seen only in infants, and monocular OKR becomes symmetric by six months of age because of cortical development. In several species, OKR is also more reliably evoked by upward motion than by downward motion. Both vertical and horizontal asymmetries are often attributed to functional adaptations that reflect common natural scene statistics associated with forward terrestrial locomotion.

== Neural mechanisms ==
OKR is driven by a dedicated visual pathway called the accessory optic system (AOS).

=== Retina ===
The AOS begins in the retina with a specialized class of retinal ganglion cell known as ON direction selective retinal ganglion cells (oDSGCs). These cells respond selectively to motion in one of three cardinal directions (upward, downward, or nasal motion), and inherit their direction selectivity at least partially from asymmetric inhibition from starburst amacrine cells. Glycinergic inhibition produces a speed tuning preference for slow stimulus motion in oDSGCs, which has been used to explain the analogous slow tuning of OKR. In some species, oDSGCs constitute the displaced ganglion cells, whose cell bodies reside in the inner nuclear layer of the retina. oDSGCs that respond to different directions of motion have slightly different response properties that are also reflected in OKR behavior, and it is thought that a linear subtraction of oDSGC spikes may predict the magnitude of the OKR slow phase.

=== Midbrain ===
oDSGC axons do not target common visual structures. Instead, they are likely the only retinal ganglion cell type to innervate the three midbrain nuclei of the AOS: the nucleus of the optic tract (NOT), the lateral terminal nucleus (LTN), and the medial terminal nucleus (MTN). These nuclei are targeted by oDSGCs that prefer nasal, downward, and upward image motion, respectively. Recurrent inhibitory connections exist between these AOS nuclei, further suggesting a subtraction of signals between different oDSGC types. There are only modest connections between these nuclei and the cortex. The activity of neurons in the AOS nuclei are well-correlated with the velocity of the OKR slow phase.

=== Oculomotor plant ===
The projection neurons of the NOT, LTN, and MTN converge on the oculomotor plant in the brainstem, where their activity is integrated to drive the eye movements. This occurs through Cranial Nerves III, IV, and VI, and their associated brainstem nuclei.

=== Plasticity ===
Potentiation of the OKR slow phase is known to occur after long periods of continuous stimulation. These mechanisms are cerebellar-dependent, and may be associated with corresponding changes to the VOR.

== Scientific and medical interest ==
The reflexive nature of OKR has made it a popular method for objectively measuring vision in many contexts. OKR-based tests have been developed to objectively assess visual acuity, color vision, stereopsis and more. Changes to the stereotypical OKR waveform can also be a biomarker of disease, including stroke, concussion, drug or alcohol intoxication, and parkinsonism. OKR is also commonly used in basic science as an objective measure of acuity in animal disease models.

In neurobiology, the isolation of the AOS from other visual pathways, its clear connection to a behavioral readout in the form of OKR, and its conservation across species make it an attractive model system to study. The AOS has been used to understand molecular mechanisms of synapse formation, feature tuning and direction selectivity in the retina, neural circuit development, axon targeting, plasticity mechanisms, and computational strategies for integrating primary sensory information.

== See also ==
- Eye movement
- Nystagmus
- Reflex
