= Lateral intraparietal cortex =

Brain region in the intraparietal sulcus

The lateral intraparietal cortex (area LIP) is found in the intraparietal sulcus of the brain. This area is most likely involved in eye movement, as electrical stimulation evokes saccades (quick movements) of the eyes. It is also thought to contribute to working memory associated with guiding eye movement, examined using a delayed saccade task described below:

1. A subject focuses on a fixation point at the center of a computer screen.
2. A target (for instance a shape) is presented at a peripheral location on the screen.
3. The target is removed and followed by a variable-length delay period.
4. The initial focus point in the middle of the screen is removed.
5. The subject's task is to make a saccade to the location of the target.

Neurons in area LIP have been shown to start responding with the initial presentation of the stimulus. The neurons keep responding through the delay period until the saccadic eye movement starts and the animal soon focuses on the exact location of the previously shown target. There is also evidence for neurons firing for saccadic responses in the two-alternative forced choice task. The conclusion of this task experiment is that neurons in area LIP store information (the location of the target) useful for guiding the saccadic movement; that is, this area of the cortex shows modality-specific working memory.

Areas showing specificity for other modalities have been located.
