= Conus papillaris =

Feature of the reptilian eye

The conus papillaris (Latin for "nipple-like cone") is a feature of the reptilian eye which originates from the ventro-temporal optic nerve head and rises into the vitreous. The cone is vascular (and thus has been also called a conus vascularis). It is homologous to the avian pecten oculi. However, the one in birds is much more elaborate in size and development. Other than blood vessels and connective tissue, it also contains varying amounts of muscular and neural tissue. It is generally pigmented darkly.

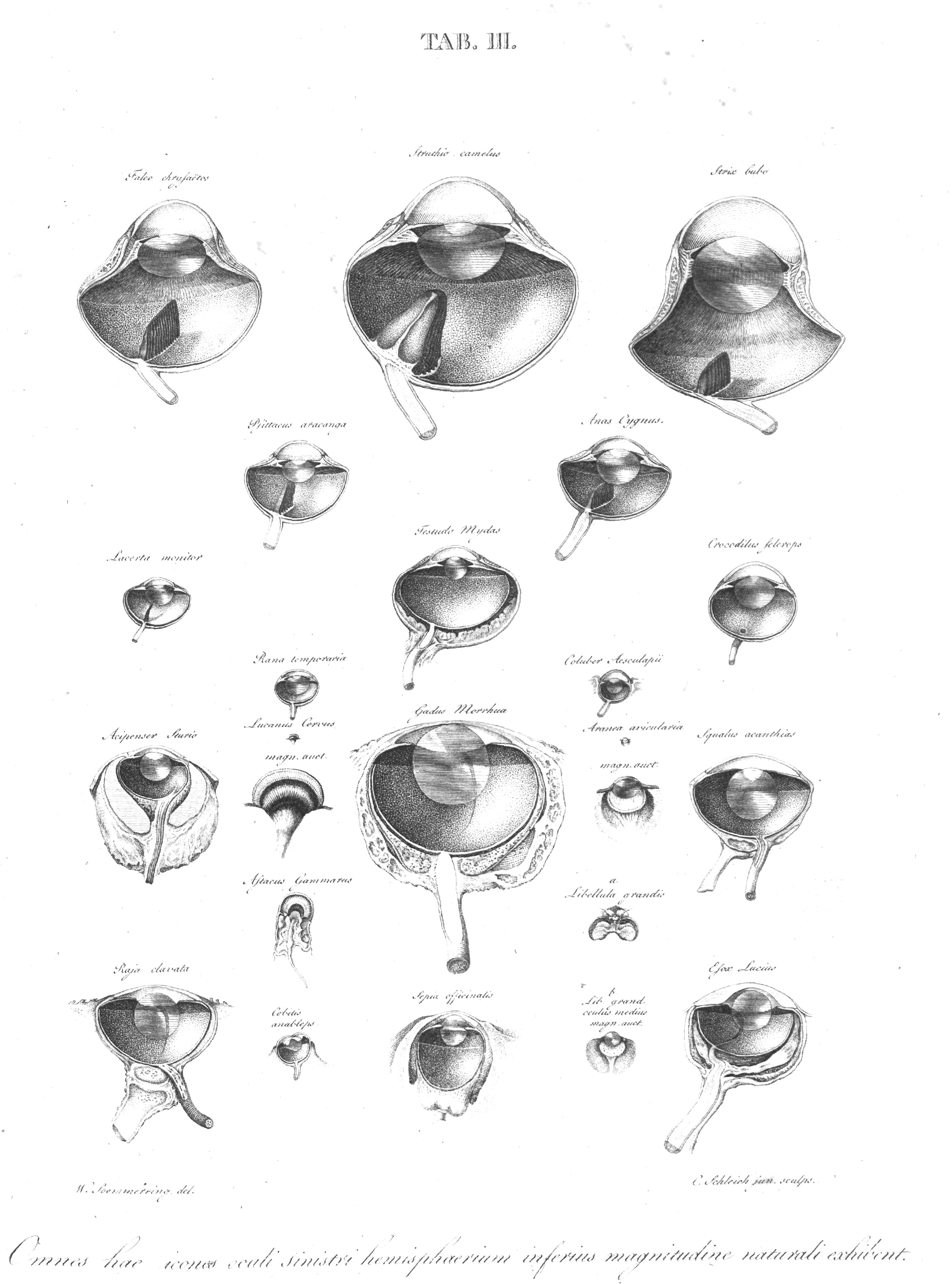
The horizontal section diagrams of different forms of eyes. Of these, the Lacerta monitor (third row left) shows the conus. The top left is of an eagle (Falco chrysaëtos), and shows the pleated type. The top middle is of an ostrich (Struthio camelus), and shows the vaned type. In some, like the Anas cygnus, the pectan almost touching the lens.

In lizards, it is believed to supply oxygen and nutrition to the avascular retina, like the pecten in birds, who also have an avascular retina. It does not exist in turtles, is functionless in adult crocodilians, and replaced by other structures in most snakes.

It was first described in 1818 by Sömmerring.

== Across vertebrates ==
The conus generally contains blood vessels, connective tissue, muscular tissue, and neural tissue. The pigments are generally melanin produced by melanocytes within it. Its stroma may contain numerous mast cells.

Both the pecten and the conus is made of a mesodermal core, covered with neuroectodermal tissue. Unlike the pecten oculi in birds, the conus contains muscular and neural tissue. Its endothelial morphology has extensively folded basal and apical surfaces that increase its surface area. This is similar to the pecten, with many apical and basal microfolds. Its vessels are not generated from the hyaloid artery of the embryonic optic nerve, because the hyaloid disappears before the conus is formed.

The teleosts generally have an avascular retina. Their retina is supplied by the choroid, as well as three possible structures (different species have different combinations of them). The falciform process is an extension of the choroid. It is a sickle-shaped thin structure, highly vascularized, rising up through the optic fissure into the vitreous body. It also has the function of being the site where the retractor lentis muscle is attached. The muscle can contract, pulling the lens back for accommodation. The falciform process varies in height. At the highest extreme, it touches the lens, cutting the vitreous body into two. In the Pantodon buchholzi, such an extreme falciform process is used for an optical function. The fish sees both above and below water, and the dorsal half of the retina sees the water and internally reflected water, while the ventral half of the retina sees the sky. The falciform process forms a horizontal shelf across the retina, thus reducing stray light between the two halves. There is a pseudo-conus reported in the Radiicephalus elongatus, vascularized by the choroid and the hyaloid.

The falciform process is entirely mesodermal. Because of this, the conus is considered not homologous to the falciform process, despite similar appearances. Some teleosts have a choroidal gland, which is not a gland, but a rete mirabilis. Some teleosts have a membrana vasculosa retinae, a preretinal membrane made of a plexus of blood vessels that branch out of the hyaloid artery. The eel is unique in that its preretinal membrane sends numerous vessels into the retina, thus making it the only fish to have intraretinal vessels.

Most snakes have a preretinal membrane. Some snakes have a vestigial and stubby pseudo-conus consisting of hyaloid blood vessels, nonmyelinated nerves, and a mass of pigmented connective tissue. It is entirely mesodermal, and thus not homologous to the conus or the pecten. It is best developed and heavily pigmented in Vipera berus, small, non-vascular, and pigmented in Eristocophis, and well developed and unpigmented in Lampropeltis. In Malpolon, there is a group of fibers that pass from the optic‑nerve head into the pseudo-conus, then lost in the vitreous humor. Some snakes, such as Epicrates and Coronella, have a mesodermic pseudo-conus in the embryo that is reduced or lost in the adult.

The preretinal membrane of the Tarbophis sends numerous vessels into the retina, like the eel. This is hypothesized to be because the snake ancestors lost the eyes during a burrowing phase, and after the burrowing phase, the eyes evolved again with the retina being supplied by the hyaloid artery.

Amphibians have an avascular retina supplied by the preretinal membrane and the choroid.

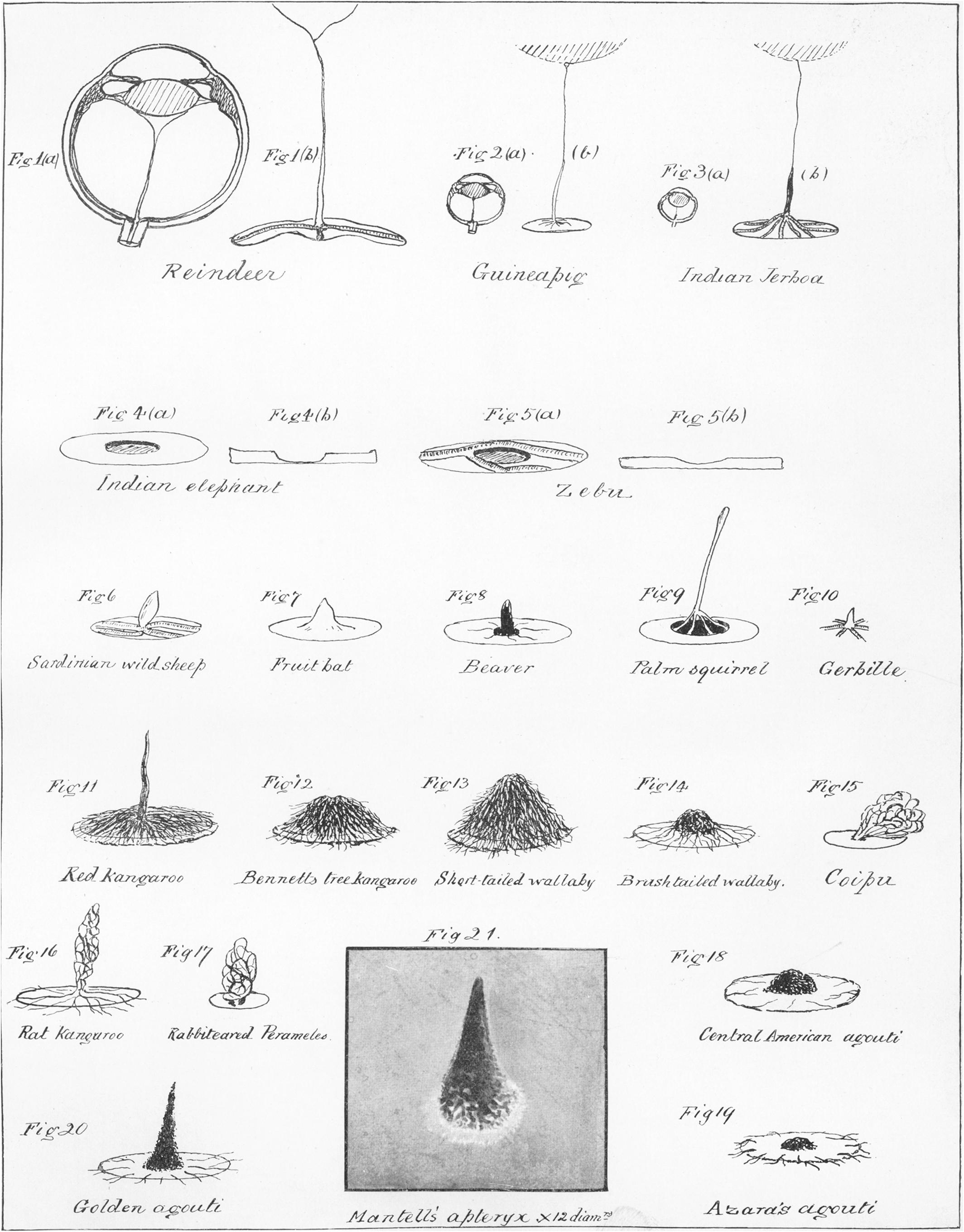
Conus-like structures in mammalian species.

Mammals lack the conus completely. The retina is supplied by the choroid and blood vessels within the retina. Some mammals have blood vessels across the whole retina (such as dogs and cats), some partly, and some none. In the megabats, the retina is avascular, but numerous choroidal papillae push into, but do not penetrate, the retina, thus providing adequate nutrition. Some mammals, such as the Agouti, and some marsupials (such as the kangaroos and wallaby) have a dome-shaped vascular pigmented structure slightly protruding from the optic disc.

In short, there are three types of blood supply systems across vertebrates:

- hyaloidal: Extensions of the hyaloid artery that passes through a partly closed optic fissure, and expanding to preretinal membrane that overlies the retina. This appears in teleosts, dipnoans, amphibians, and snakes.
- choroidal: The choroid appears in most vertebrates. In many teleosts, there is also the choroidal gland or the falciform process, both extensions of the choroid. The falciform process passes through the open optic fissure.
- central retinal artery: Systems fed by the central retinal artery that either penetrate the retina itself or form a pigmented mesodermal—neuroectodermal papilla arising from the optic‑nerve head once the optic fissure is fully fused. This appears in the conus papillaris of lizards, the pecten oculi of birds, and intraretinal vessels of mammals.

== Across reptiles ==
This section is based on.

The conus can be stubby, long or cylindrical. When it is long, it can almost touch the lens. The cross section can be circular, X-shaped, or Y-shaped (similar to the vaned type of the pecten). The surface of the conus can be smooth or velvety. It is usually small in nocturnal species, large in diurnal species, and absent in species that have degenerate eyes, such as the Amphisbaenia.

In birds, the pecten contains no neural or muscular tissue, and contains only blood vessels and connective tissue providing structural support.

The turtle retina is avascular. It has no conus. It is nourished entirely by the choroid. Marine turtles have highly vascular choroid, but non-marine turtles' choroids are not highly vascular.

The Squamata (lizards and snakes) generally has a well-developed conus, in the shape of a cone with a smooth or velvety surface texture, rising up from the optic disc, supplied by an artery and drained by veins. It is homologous to the pecten.

In crocodiles, the retina is purely nourished from the choroid. There is a rudimentary and functionless conus, consisting of a small, flat pigmented glial pad with one or two capillaries. The optic disc has no blood vessels, although there are a few capillaries in the optic nerve.

The Amphisbaenia, Anelytropsis, and Dibamus, do not have a conus. The Sphenodon does not have a conus.

In Anguis fragilis, Zonosaurus ornatus, Lacerta viridis, and Lacerta muralis, it is a thin black stalk. In Anguis fragilis, it also contains nonmyelinated nerves in close relation to stromal cell processes in perivascular spaces (suggestive of Schwann cell), flattened vascular endothelia, and pericyte-like cells containing myofibrils.

In Zonosaurus, Lacerta, and Iguana iguana, the conus contains some of the capillary endothelia have developed microfolds and has a perivascular membrane, both characteristic of the pecten, although they still have capillaries with smooth surfaced endothelia, as well as nonmyelinated nerve fibers, not characteristic of the pecten.

In Iguana iguana, and Furcifer lateralis, the conus is highly elaborate, in the shape of a thin transparent plate consisting of a regularly folded membrane around a central axis rising up from the optic disc. It resembles the "vaned" type of the pecten, appearing in ostriches (see Figure 1.). The fine structure is closer to the pecten. Long microfolds are consistently found on both surfaces of its capillary endothelia, though not as well-developed as in the pecten. Nerve fibers only appears in the base of the conus near the large blood vessels there.

== Gallery ==
Various conus structures in various species. Watercolor painting based on handheld opthalmoscopy in living organisms.
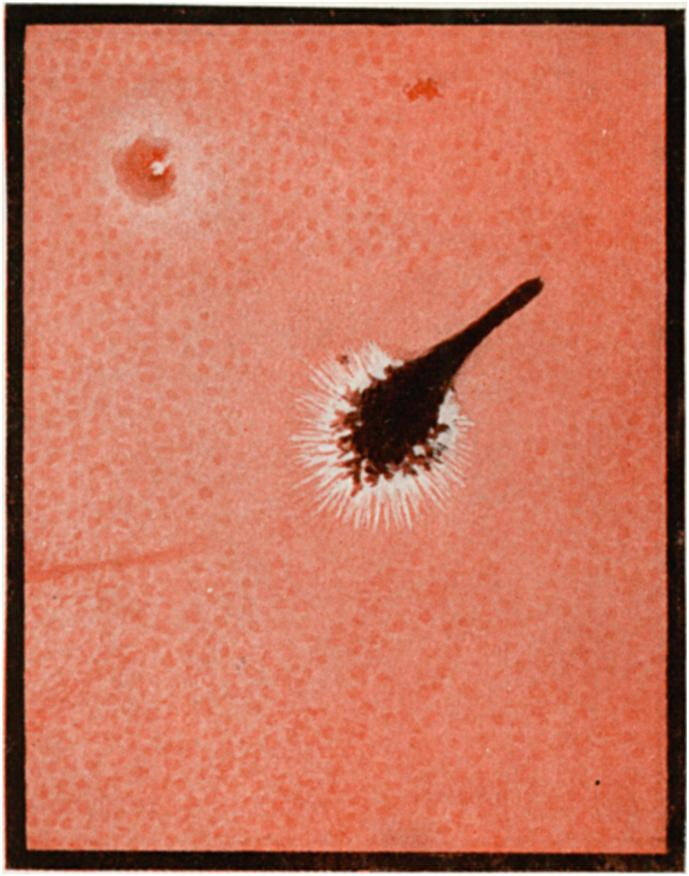
Apteryx (for comparison)

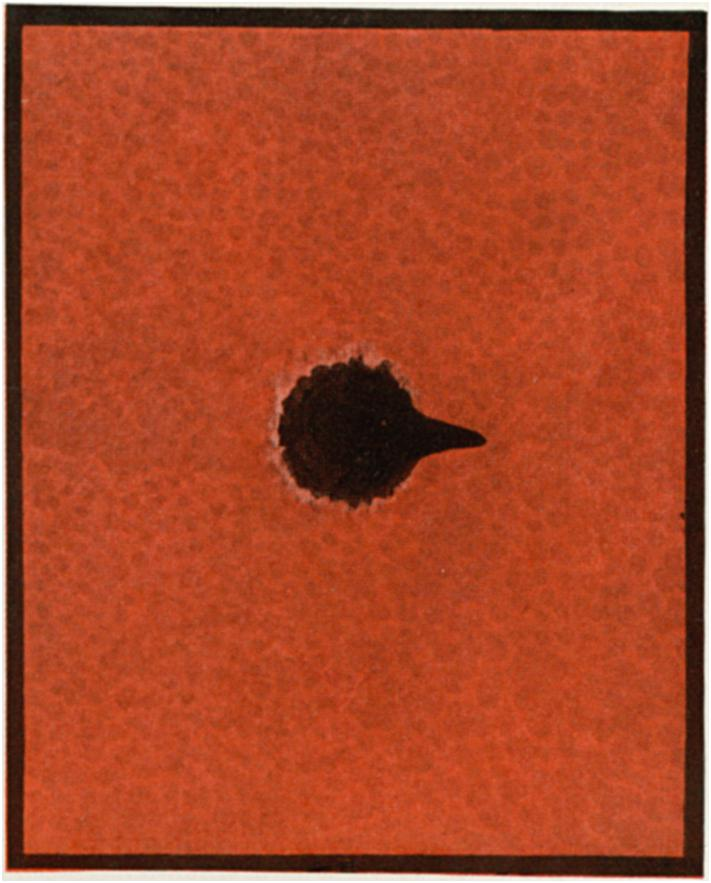
Uroplates fimbriatus (Turned)

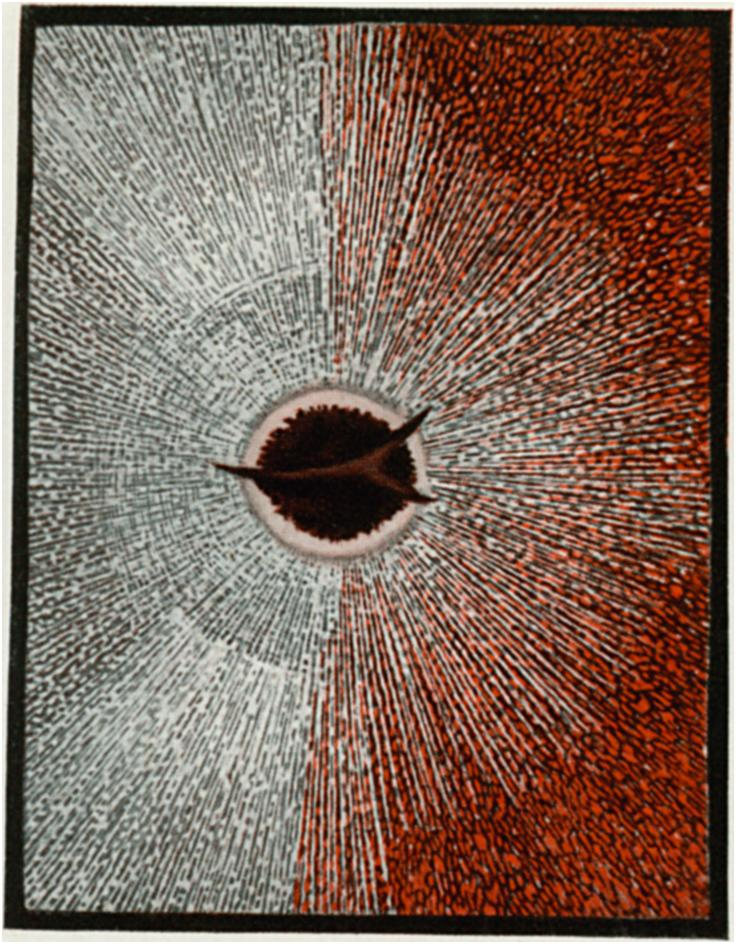
Metopoceros cornutus (Turned)

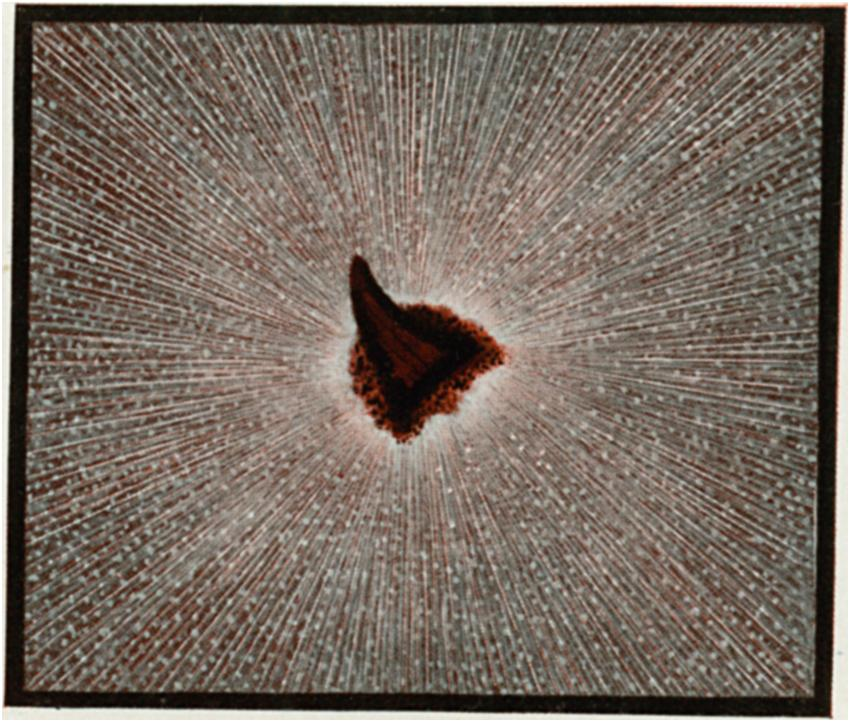
Varanus bengalensis (Turned)

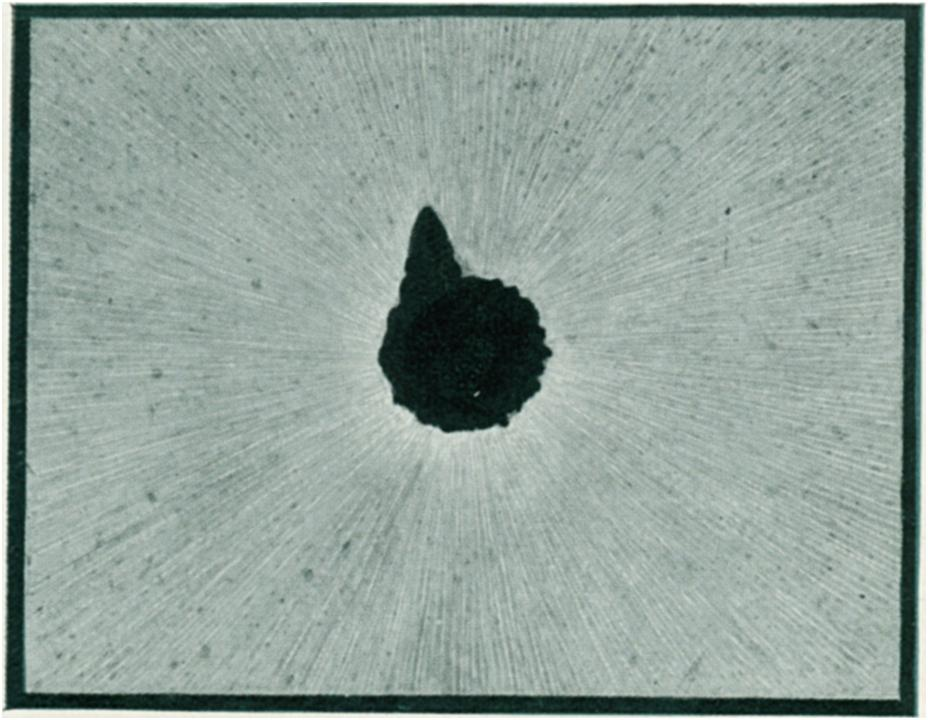
Varanus Gouldi

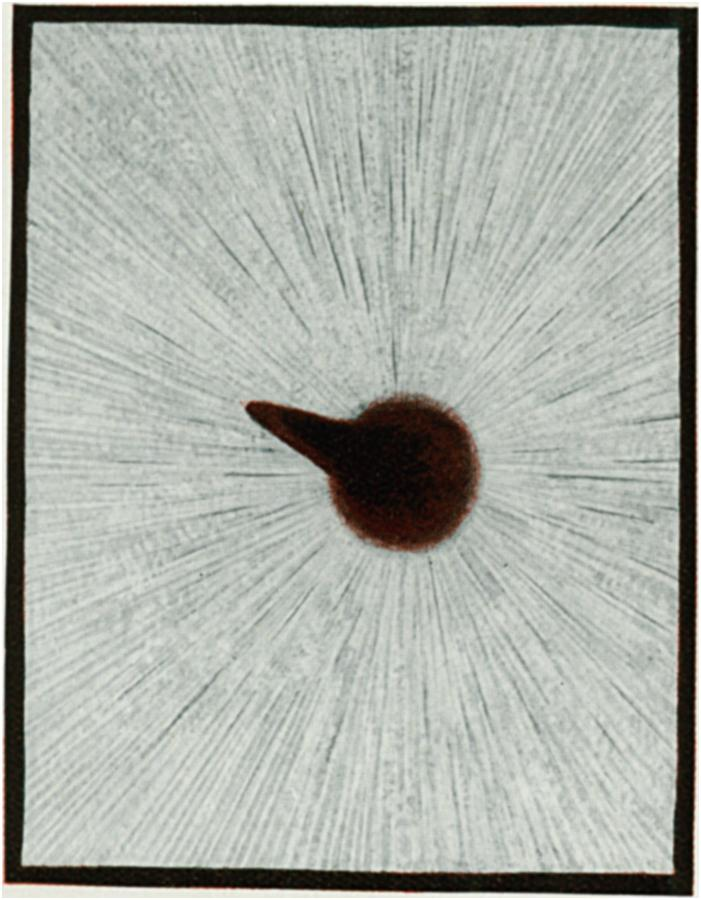
Lygosoma Quoyi (Turned)

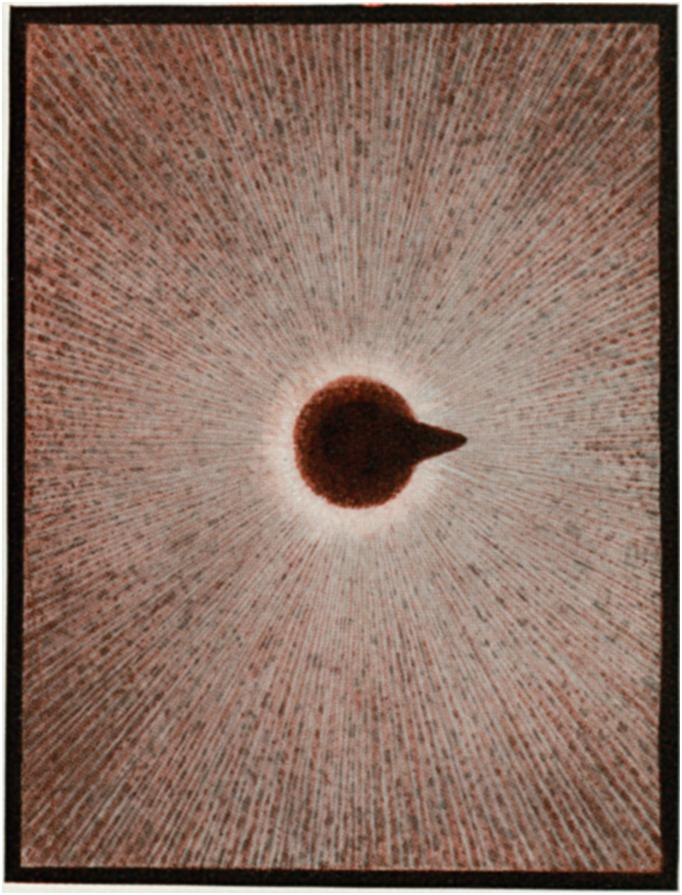
Tupinambis nigropunctatus (Turned)

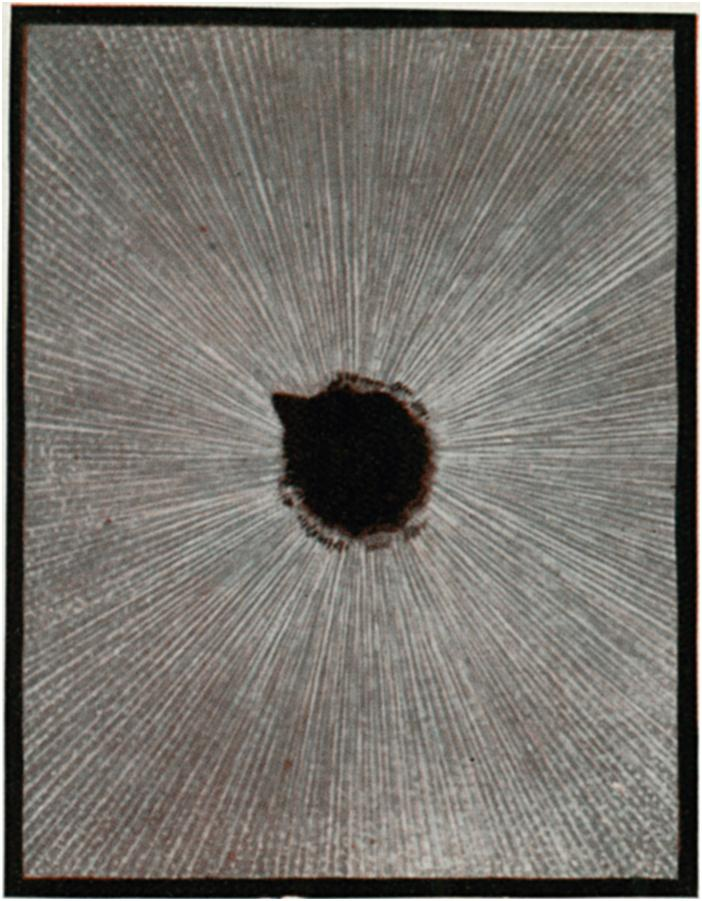
Lacerta Simonyi (Turned)

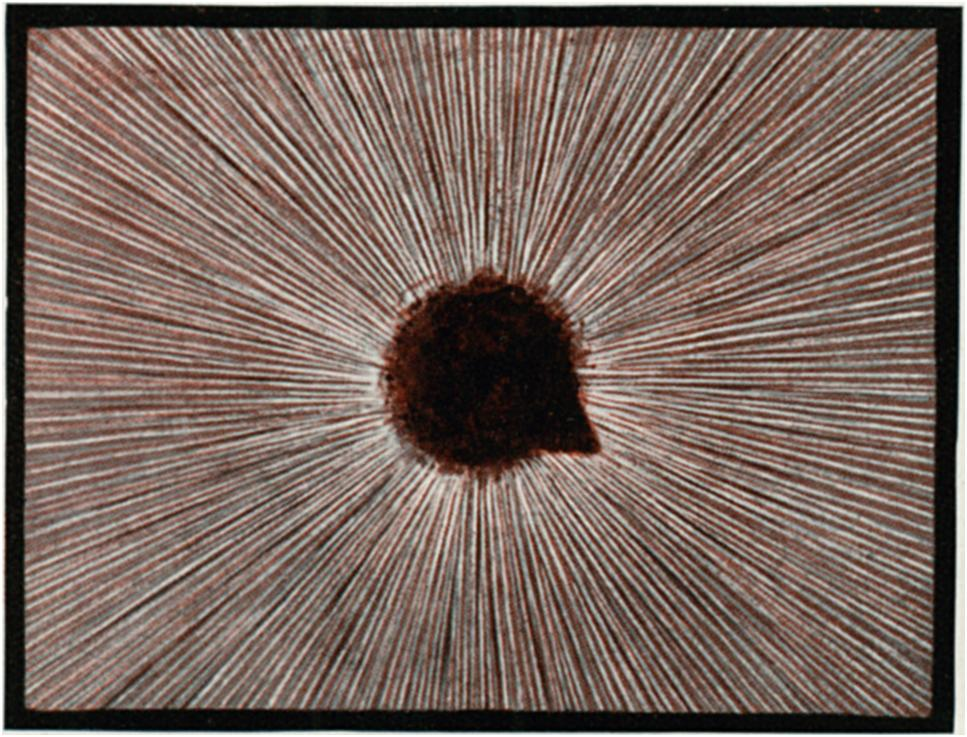
Tiliqua nigroluteus (Turned)

Where the natural orientation had to be changed, to suit the page, this is indicated by "(Turned)". All such figures have been turned 90 degrees counterclockwise.

== See also ==
- Pecten oculi
- Bird vision
- Vision in fish
