= Bird vision =

Senses for birds

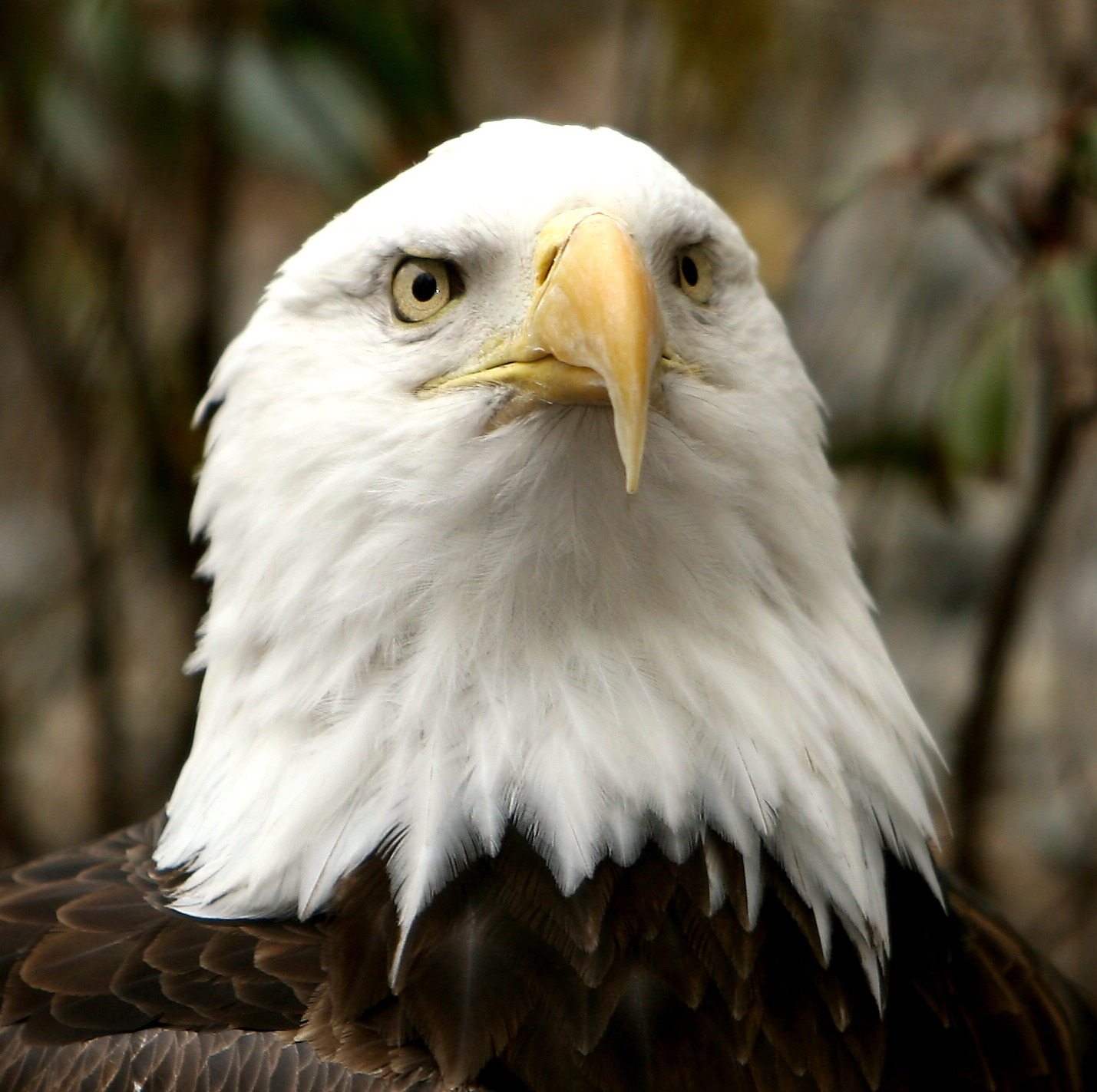
With forward-facing eyes, the bald eagle has a wide field of binocular vision.

Vision is the most important sense for birds, since good eyesight is a major leverage for safe flight. Birds have a number of adaptations which give visual acuity superior to that of other vertebrate groups; a pigeon has been described as "two eyes with wings". Birds are theropods, and the avian eye resembles that of other sauropsids, with ciliary muscles that can change the shape of the lens rapidly and to a greater extent than in the mammals. Birds have the largest eyes relative to their size in the animal kingdom, and movement is consequently limited within the eye's bony socket. In addition to the two eyelids usually found in vertebrates, bird's eyes are protected by a third transparent movable membrane. The eye's internal anatomy is similar to that of other vertebrates, but has a structure, the pecten oculi, unique to birds.

Some bird groups have specific modifications to their visual system linked to their way of life. Birds of prey have a very high density of receptors and other adaptations that maximise visual acuity. The placement of their eyes gives them good binocular vision enabling accurate judgement of distances. Nocturnal species have tubular eyes, low numbers of colour detectors, but a high density of rod cells which function well in poor light. Terns, gulls, and albatrosses are among the seabirds that have red or yellow oil droplets in the colour receptors to improve distance vision especially in hazy conditions.

== Extraocular anatomy ==
The eye of a bird most closely resembles that of reptiles. Unlike the mammalian eye, it is not spherical, and the flatter shape enables more of its visual field to be in focus. A circle of bony plates, the scleral ring, surrounds the eye and holds it rigid, but an improvement over the reptilian eye, also found in mammals, is that the lens is pushed further forward, increasing the size of the image on the retina.

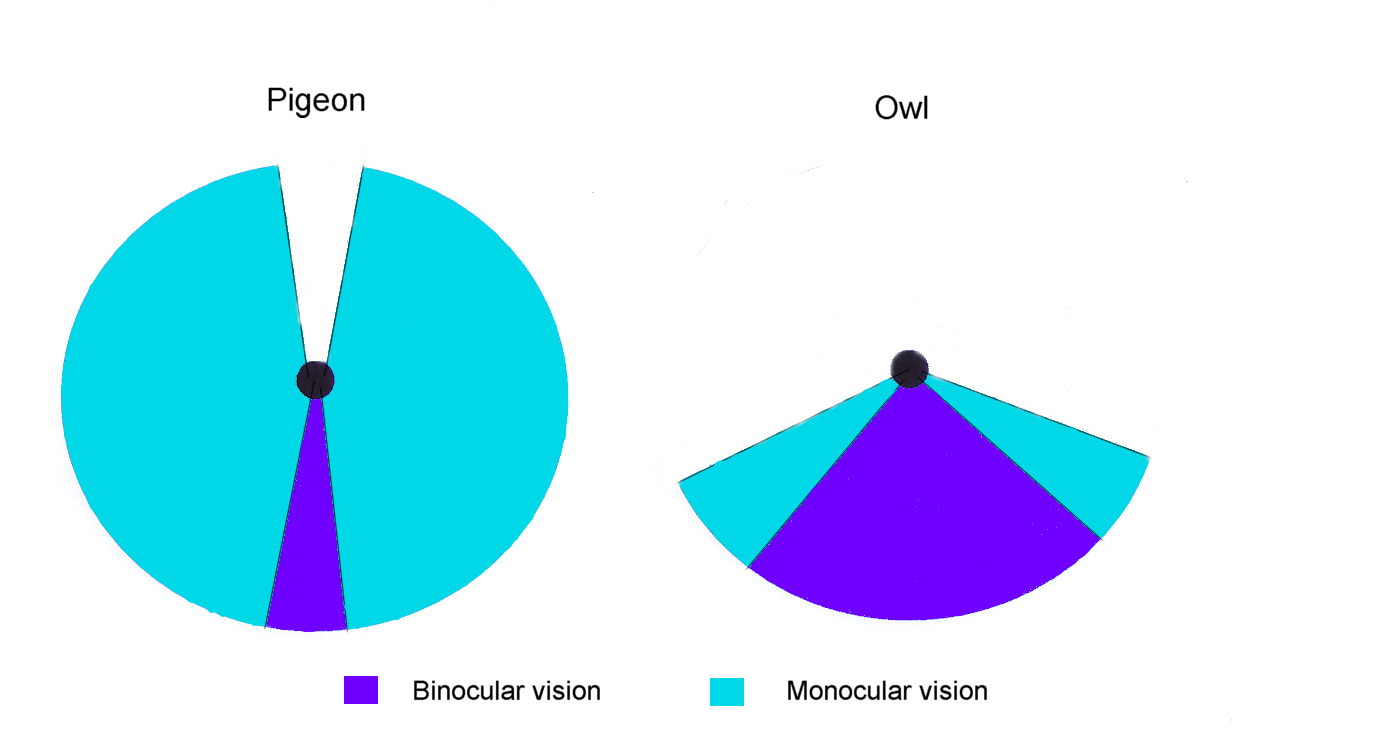
Fields of view for a pigeon and an owl

Eyes of most birds are large, not very round and capable of only limited movement in the orbits, typically 10°–20° (but in some passerines, more than 80°) horizontally. That's why for birds head movements play a bigger role than eye movements. Two eyes usually move independently, and in some species they can move coordinatedly in opposite directions.

Birds with eyes on the sides of their heads have a wide field of view, useful for detecting predators, while those with eyes on the front of their heads, such as owls, have binocular vision and can estimate distances when hunting. The American woodcock probably has the largest field of view of any bird, 360° in the horizontal plane, and 180° in the vertical plane.

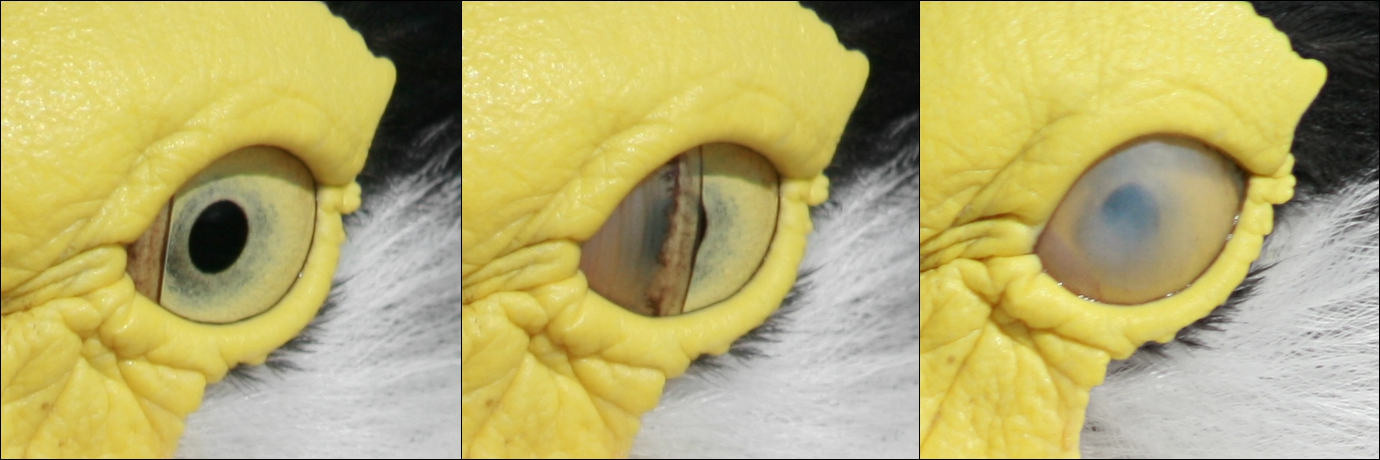
The nictitating membrane of a masked lapwing

The eyelids of a bird are not used in blinking. Instead the eye is lubricated by the nictitating membrane, a third concealed eyelid that sweeps horizontally across the eye like a windscreen wiper. The nictitating membrane also covers the eye and acts as a contact lens in many aquatic birds when they are under water. When sleeping, the lower eyelid rises to cover the eye in most birds, with the exception of the horned owls where the upper eyelid is mobile.

The eye is cleaned by tear secretions from the lachrymal gland and protected by an oily substance from the Harderian glands which coats the cornea and prevents dryness. Compared to body size, a bird's eye is proportionately larger than that of any other group of animals, although much of it is concealed in its skull. The ostrich has the largest eye of any land vertebrate, with an axial length of 50 mm (2.0 in), twice that of the human eye.

Bird eye size is broadly related to body mass. A study of five orders (parrots, pigeons, petrels, raptors and owls) showed that eye mass is proportional to body mass but, as expected from their habits and visual ecology, raptors and owls have relatively large eyes for their body mass.

Behavioural studies show that many avian species focus on distant objects preferentially with their lateral and monocular field of vision, and birds will orient themselves sideways to maximise visual resolution. For a pigeon, the resolution of its sideways monocular vision is twice that of its forward binocular vision, whereas for a human the converse is true.

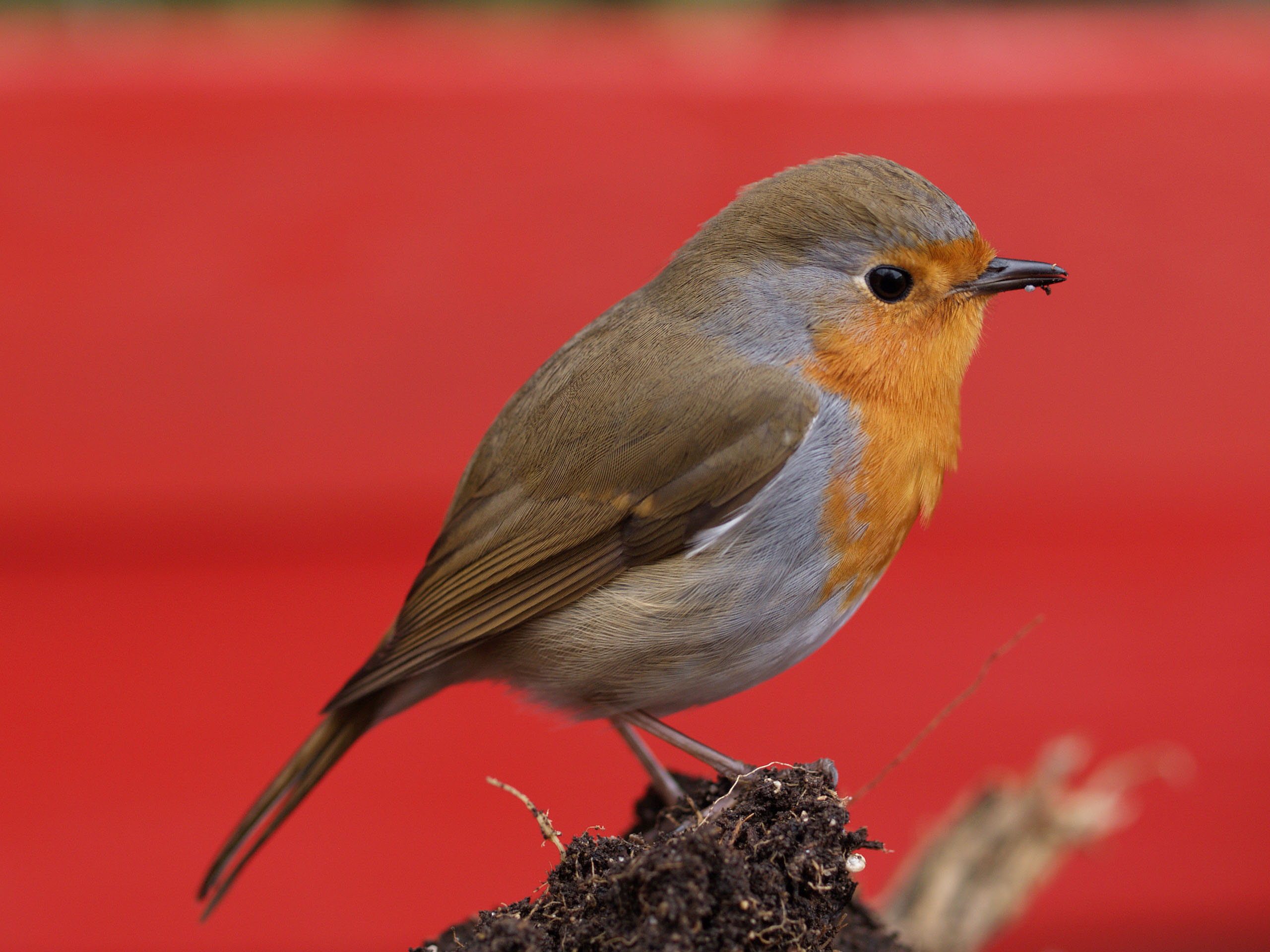
The European robin has relatively large eyes, and starts to sing early in the morning.

The performance of the eye in low light levels depends on the distance between the lens and the retina, and small birds are effectively forced to be diurnal because their eyes are not large enough to give adequate night vision. Although many species migrate at night, they often collide with even brightly lit objects, like lighthouses or oil platforms. Birds of prey, too, are diurnal because, although their eyes are large, they are optimised for maximum spatial resolution rather than for light gathering, and so do not function well in poor lighting. Many birds have an asymmetry in the eye's structure which enables them to keep the horizon and a significant part of the ground in focus simultaneously. The cost of this adaptation is that they have myopia in the lower part of their visual field.

Nocturnal birds have eyes optimised for visual sensitivity, with large corneas relative to the eye's length, whereas diurnal birds have longer eyes relative to the corneal diameter to give greater visual acuity. Information about the activities of extinct species can be deduced from measurements of the scleral ring and orbit depth. For the latter measurement to be made, the fossil must have retained its three-dimensional shape, so activity patterns cannot be determined with confidence from flattened specimens like Archaeopteryx, for which measurements have been made of its scleral ring but not its orbit depth.

== Anatomy of the eye ==
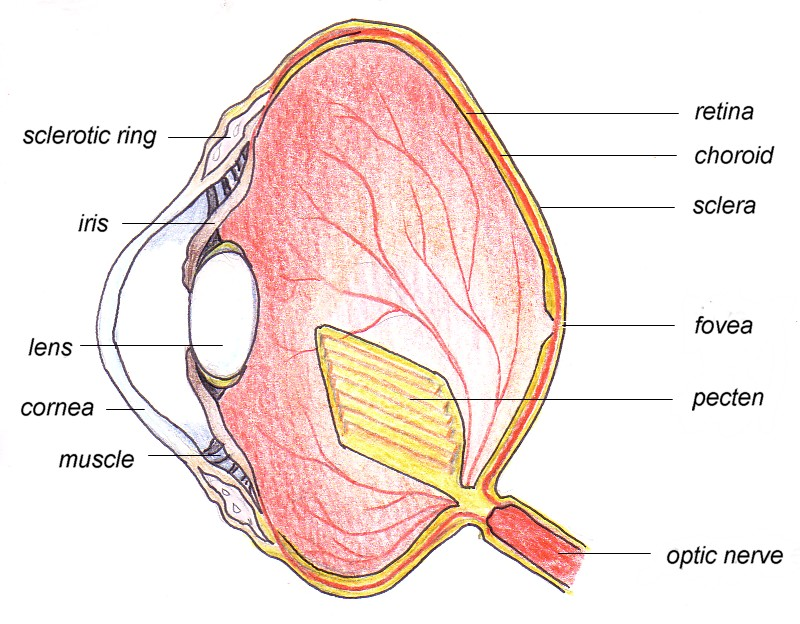
Anatomy of the avian eye

The main structures of the bird eye are similar to those of other vertebrates. The outer layer of the eye consists of the transparent cornea at the front, and two layers of sclera — a tough white collagen fibre layer which surrounds the rest of the eye and supports and protects the eye as a whole. The eye is divided internally by the lens into two main segments: the anterior segment and the posterior segment. The anterior segment is filled with a watery fluid called the aqueous humour, and the posterior segment contains the vitreous humour, a clear jelly-like substance.

The lens is a transparent, convexed, or 'lens'-shaped body, with a harder outer layer and a softer inner layer. It focuses the light on the retina. The shape of the lens can be altered by ciliary muscles which are directly attached to the lens capsule by means of the zonular fibres. In addition to these muscles, some birds also have a second set, Crampton's muscles, that can change the shape of the cornea, thus giving birds a greater range of accommodation than is possible for mammals. This accommodation can be rapid in some diving water birds such as in the mergansers. The iris is a coloured muscularly operated diaphragm in front of the lens which controls the amount of light entering the eye. At the centre of the iris is the pupil, the variable circular area through which the light passes into the eye.

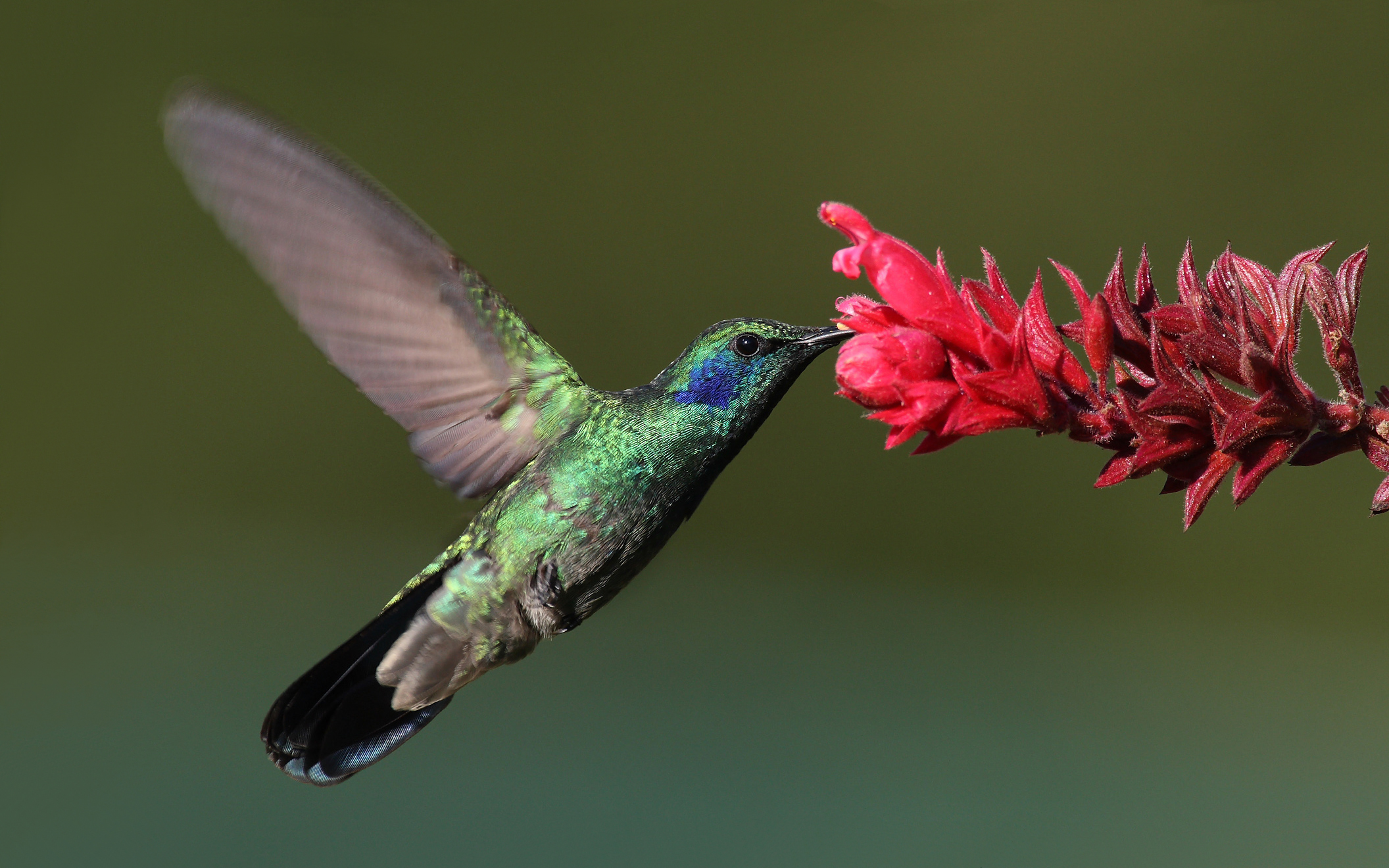
Hummingbirds are amongst the many birds with two foveae

The retina is a relatively smooth curved multi-layered structure containing the photosensitive rod and cone cells with the associated neurons and blood vessels. The density of the photoreceptors is critical in determining the maximum attainable visual acuity. Humans have about 200,000 receptors per mm^{2}, but the house sparrow has 400,000 and the common buzzard 1,000,000. The photoreceptors are not all individually connected to the optic nerve, and the ratio of nerve ganglia to receptors is important in determining resolution. This is very high for birds; the white wagtail has 100,000 ganglion cells to 120,000 photoreceptors.

Rods are more sensitive to light, but give no colour information, whereas the less sensitive cones enable colour vision. In diurnal birds, 80% of the receptors may be cones (90% in some swifts) whereas nocturnal owls have almost all rods. As with other vertebrates except placental mammals, some of the cones may be double cones. These can amount to 50% of all cones in some species.

Towards the centre of the retina is the fovea (or the less specialised, area centralis) which has a greater density of receptors and is the area of greatest forward visual acuity, i.e. sharpest, clearest detection of objects. In 54% of birds, including birds of prey, kingfishers, hummingbirds and swallows, there is second fovea for enhanced sideways viewing. The optic nerve is a bundle of nerve fibres which carry messages from the eye to the relevant parts of the brain. Like mammals, birds have a small blind spot without photoreceptors at the optic disc, under which the optic nerve and blood vessels join the eye.

The pecten is a poorly understood body consisting of folded tissue which projects from the retina. It is well supplied with blood vessels and appears to keep the retina supplied with nutrients, and may also shade the retina from dazzling light or aid in detecting moving objects. Pecten oculi is abundantly filled with melanin granules which have been proposed to absorb stray light entering the bird eye to reduce background glare. Slight warming of pecten oculi due to absorption of light by melanin granules has been proposed to enhance metabolic rate of pecten. This is suggested to help increase secretion of nutrients into the vitreous body, eventually to be absorbed by the avascular retina of birds for improved nutrition. Extra-high enzymic activity of alkaline phosphatase in pecten oculi has been proposed to support high secretory activity of pecten to supplement nutrition of the retina.

The choroid is a layer situated behind the retina which contains many small arteries and veins. These provide arterial blood to the retina and drain venous blood. The choroid contains melanin, a pigment which gives the inner eye its dark colour, helping to prevent disruptive reflections.

Within birds, reptiles, and fishes, there is a ring of thin bone plates (ossicles), called the scleral ring (or sclerotic ring). Lizards typically have 14 ossicles in the sclera, and birds 12–18, though 14 is the most common. These ossicles are on the border between the sclera and the cornea, and they tightly overlap one another to form a ring. Crocodiles and snakes do not have these. The bones in birds have mechanical functions in corneal accommodation and lenticular accommodation by the contraction of ciliary muscles and circumferential iris muscles.

== Light perception ==
Normalized absorption spectra (0-100%). The four pigments in estrildid finches' cones extend the range of colour vision into the ultraviolet.

A bird's eye has two main types of light receptors: rods and cones. Rods, which contain the visual pigment rhodopsin are better for night vision because they are sensitive to very low light levels. By contrast, cones detect specific colours (wavelengths) of light, a benefit more important to colour-orientated animals such as birds. The eyes of most birds are tetrachromatic, possessing four types of cone cells, each sensitive to a distinct range of wavelengths. For many birds, the cone cells sensitive to the shortest wavelengths have absorption peaks in the ultraviolet (UV) range, making their eyes UV-sensitive. In addition, the cones of a bird's retina are arranged in what is known as a hyperuniform distribution, which maximizes the eye's absorption of light and color. This form of spatial distribution is believed to be an evolutionary optimisation.

The four spectrally distinct cone pigments are derived from the protein opsin, linked to a small molecule called retinal, which is closely related to vitamin A. When the pigment absorbs light the retinal changes shape and alters the membrane potential of the cone cell affecting neurons in the ganglia layer of the retina. Each neuron in the ganglion layer may process information from a number of photoreceptor cells, and may in turn trigger a nerve impulse to relay information along the optic nerve for further processing in specialised visual centres in the brain. The more intense a light, the more photons are absorbed by the visual pigments; the greater the excitation of each cone, and the brighter the light appears.

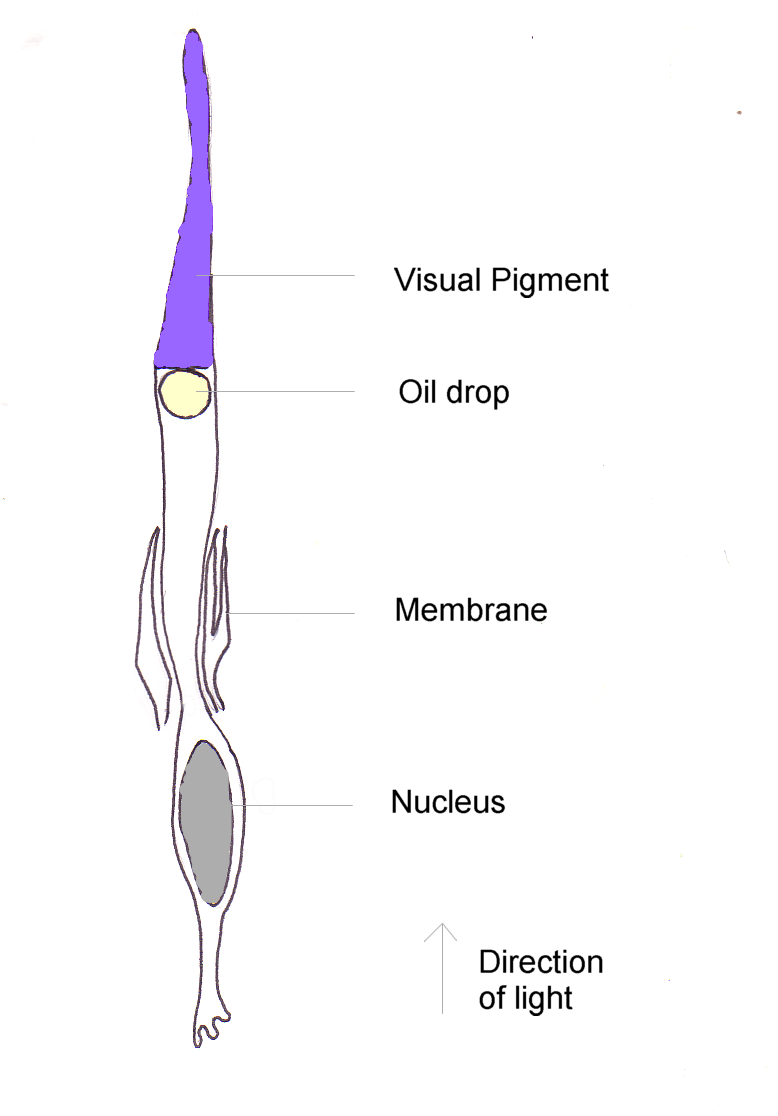
Diagram of a bird cone cell

By far the most abundant cone pigment in every bird species examined is the long-wavelength form of iodopsin, which absorbs at wavelengths near 570 nm. This is roughly the spectral region occupied by the red- and green-sensitive pigments in the primate retina, and this visual pigment dominates the colour sensitivity of birds. In penguins, this pigment appears to have shifted its absorption peak to 543 nm, presumably an adaptation to a blue aquatic environment.

The information conveyed by a single cone is limited: by itself, the cell cannot tell the brain which wavelength of light caused its excitation. A visual pigment may absorb two wavelengths equally, but even though their photons are of different energies, the cone cannot tell them apart, because they both cause the retinal to change shape and thus trigger the same impulse. For the brain to see colour, it must compare the responses of two or more classes of cones containing different visual pigments, so the four pigments in birds give increased discrimination.

Each cone of a bird or reptile contains a coloured oil droplet; these no longer exist in mammals. The droplets, which contain high concentrations of carotenoids, are placed so that light passes through them before reaching the visual pigment. They act as filters, removing some wavelengths and narrowing the absorption spectra of the pigments. This reduces the response overlap between pigments and increases the number of colours that a bird can discern. Six types of cone oil droplets have been identified; five of these have carotenoid mixtures that absorb at different wavelengths and intensities, and the sixth type has no pigments. The cone pigments with the lowest maximal absorption peak, including those that are UV-sensitive, possess the 'clear' or 'transparent' type of oil droplets with little spectral tuning effect.

The colours and distributions of retinal oil droplets vary considerably among species, and is more dependent on the ecological niche utilised (hunter, fisher, herbivore) than genetic relationships. As examples, diurnal hunters like the barn swallow and birds of prey have few coloured droplets, whereas the surface fishing common tern has a large number of red and yellow droplets in the dorsal retina. The evidence suggests that oil droplets respond to natural selection faster than the cone's visual pigments. Even within the range of wavelengths that are visible to humans, passerine birds can detect colour differences that humans do not register. This finer discrimination, together with the ability to see ultraviolet light, means that many species show sexual dichromatism that is visible to birds but not humans.

Migratory songbirds use the Earth's magnetic field, stars, the Sun, and other unknown cues to determine their migratory direction. An American study suggested that migratory Savannah sparrows used polarised light from an area of sky near the horizon to recalibrate their magnetic navigation system at both sunrise and sunset. This suggested that skylight polarisation patterns are the primary calibration reference for all migratory songbirds. However, it appears that birds may be responding to secondary indicators of the angle of polarisation, and may not be actually capable of directly detecting polarisation direction in the absence of these cues.

=== Ultraviolet sensitivity ===
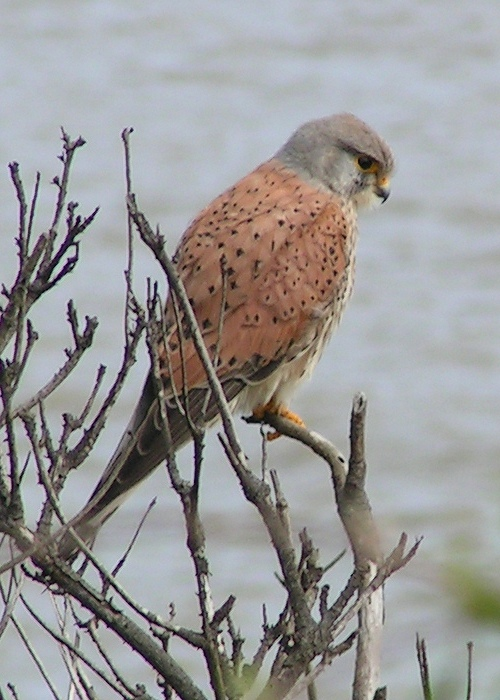
The common kestrel, like other raptorial birds, have a very low sensitivity to UV light.

Many species of birds are tetrachromatic, with dedicated cone cells for perceiving wavelengths in the ultraviolet and violet regions of the light spectrum. These cells contain a combination of short-wavelength-sensitive (SWS1) opsins, SWS1-like opsins (SWS2), and long-wavelength-filtering carotenoid pigments for selectively filtering and receiving light between 300 and 400 nm. There are two types of short-wavelength color vision in birds: violet sensitive (VS) and ultraviolet sensitive (UVS). Single nucleotide substitutions in the SWS1 opsin sequence are responsible for blue-shifting the spectral sensitivity of the opsin from violet sensitive (λ_{max} = 400 nm) to ultraviolet sensitive (λ_{max} = 310–360 nm). This is the proposed evolutionary mechanism by which ultraviolet vision originally arose. The major clades of birds that have UVS vision are Palaeognathae (ratites and tinamous), Charadriiformes (shorebirds, gulls, and alcids), Trogoniformes (trogons), Psittaciformes (parrots), and Passeriformes (perching birds, representing more than half of all avian species).

UVS vision can be useful for courtship. Birds that do not exhibit sexual dichromatism in wavelengths visible to humans are sometimes distinguished by the presence of ultraviolet reflective patches on their feathers. Male blue tits have an ultraviolet reflective crown patch which is displayed in courtship by posturing and raising of their nape feathers. Male blue grosbeaks with the brightest and most UV-shifted blue in their plumage are larger, hold the most extensive territories with abundant prey, and feed their offspring more frequently than other males. Mediterranean storm petrels do not show sexual dimorphism in UV patterns, but the correlation between UV reflectance and male body condition suggests a possible role in sexual selection.

The bill's appearance is important in the interactions of the blackbird. Although the UV component seems unimportant in interactions between territory-holding males, where the degree of orange is the main factor, the female responds more strongly to males with bills that have good UV reflectiveness.

UVS has been demonstrated to serve in foraging, prey identification, and frugivory. Similar advantages afforded to trichromatic primates over dichromatic primates in frugivory are generally considered to exist in birds. The waxy surfaces of many fruits and berries may reflect UV light that advertise their presence to UVS birds. However, widespread evidence in support of colour-mediated frugivory is equivocal and may be scale dependent. Common kestrels are able to locate the trails of voles with vision; these small rodents lay scent trails of urine and feces that reflect UV light, making them visible to the kestrels. However, this view has been challenged by the finding of low UV sensitivity in raptors and weak UV reflection of mammal urine.

While tetrachromatic vision is not exclusive to birds (insects, reptiles, and crustaceans are also sensitive to short wavelengths), some predators of UVS birds cannot see ultraviolet light. This raises the possibility that ultraviolet vision gives birds a channel in which they can privately signal, thereby remaining inconspicuous to predators. However, recent evidence does not appear to support this hypothesis.

Birds may also use ultraviolet clues to distinguish between clean and polluted water bodies. The principal waste product of avian nitrogen metabolism is uric acid that absorbs UV light and remains mostly undissolved in water, while the carbamide in mammals' urine reflects UV light. However, double-choice experiments on pigeons have not shown detectable preferences towards clean water.

== Perception ==
=== Contrast sensitivity ===
Contrast (or more precisely Michelson-contrast) is defined as the difference in luminance between two stimulus areas, divided by the sum of luminance of the two. Contrast sensitivity is the inverse of the smallest contrast that can be detected; a contrast sensitivity of 100 means that the smallest (Michelson-) contrast that can be detected is 1%. Birds have comparably lower contrast sensitivity than mammals. Humans have been shown to detect contrasts as low as 0.5-1% whereas most birds tested require ca. 10% contrast to show a behavioural response. A contrast sensitivity function describes an animal's ability to detect the contrast of grating patterns of different spatial frequencies (i.e. different detail). For stationary viewing experiments the contrast sensitivity is highest at a medium spatial frequency and lower for higher and lower spatial frequencies.

=== Movement ===
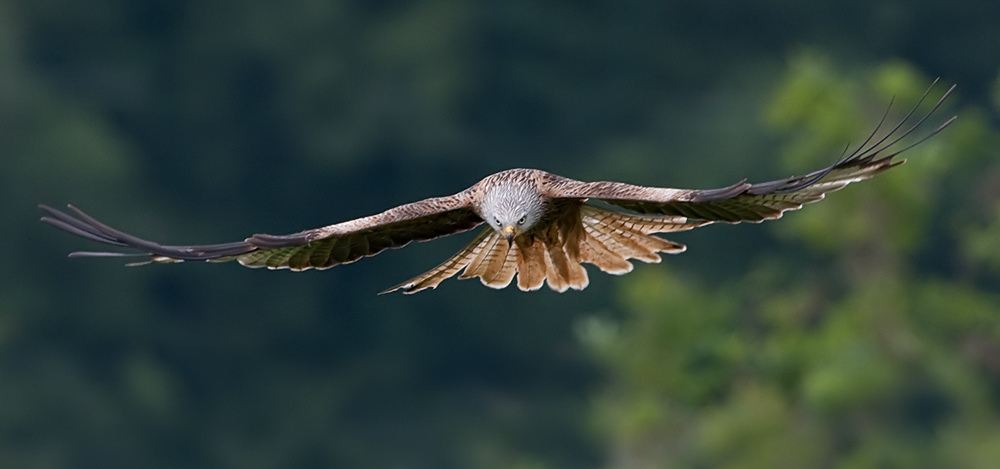
A red kite flying at a bird feeding station in Scotland

Birds can resolve rapid movements better than humans, for whom flickering at a rate greater than 50–60 hertz (Hz) appears as continuous movement. Humans therefore cannot distinguish individual 60-Hz flashes, or flicker, of a fluorescent light bulb, but budgerigars, chickens and pigeons all have light-flicker thresholds exceeding 100 Hz. A Cooper's hawk can pursue agile prey through woodland at high speed while avoiding branches and other objects; to humans, such a chase would appear as a blur.

Birds can also detect slow-moving objects. The movement of the sun and the constellations across the sky is imperceptible to humans, but detected by birds. The ability to detect these movements helps migrating birds to properly orient themselves.

To obtain steady images while flying or when perched on a swaying branch, birds hold their head as steady as possible with compensating reflexes. Maintaining a steady image is especially relevant for birds of prey. Because the image can be centered on the deep fovea of only one eye at a time, most falcons when diving use a spiral path to approach their prey after they have locked on to a target individual. The alternative of turning their head for a better view slows down the dive by increasing drag, whereas spiralling does not reduce speeds significantly.

=== Edges and shapes ===
When an object is partially blocked by another, humans unconsciously tend to make up for it and complete the shapes (See Amodal perception). It has however been demonstrated that pigeons do not complete occluded shapes. A study based on altering the grey level of a perch that was coloured differently from the background showed that budgerigars do not detect edges based on colours.

=== Magnetic fields ===
The perception of magnetic fields by migratory birds has been suggested to be light dependent. Birds move their head to detect the orientation of the magnetic field, and studies on the neural pathways have suggested that birds may be able to "see" the magnetic fields. The right eye of a migratory bird contains photoreceptive proteins called cryptochromes. Light excites these molecules to produce unpaired electrons that interact with the Earth's magnetic field, thus providing directional information.

== Variations across bird groups ==
=== Diurnal birds of prey ===
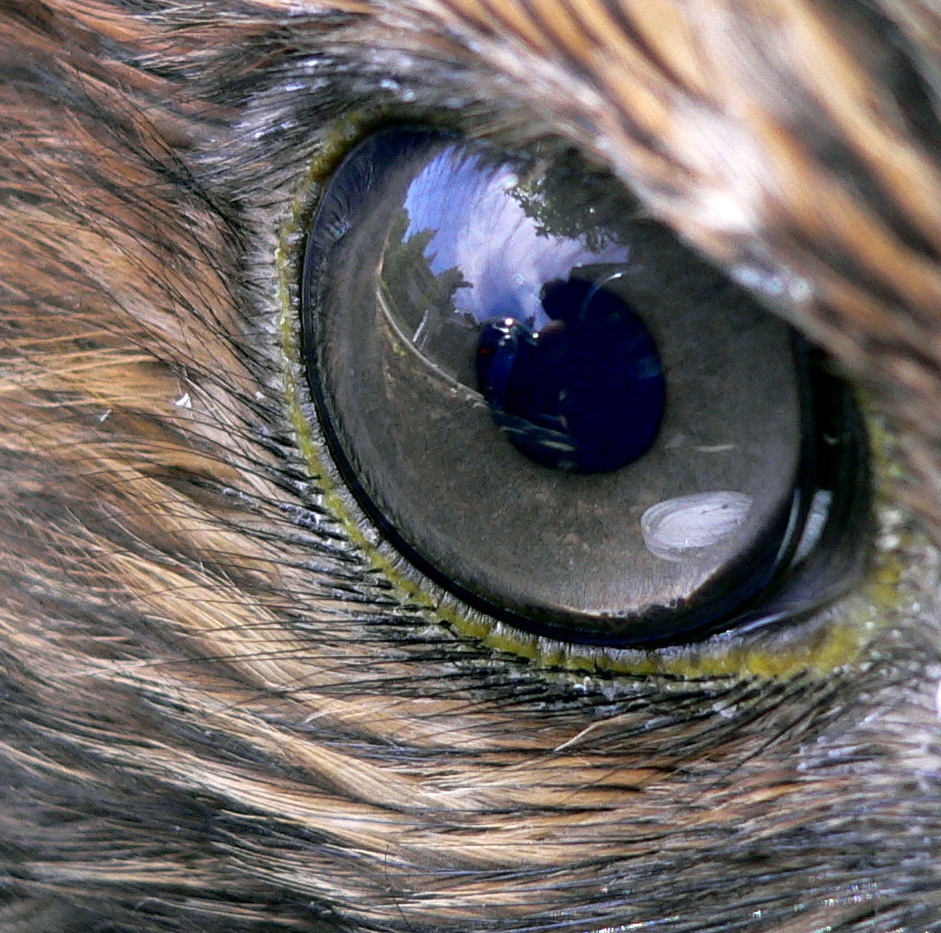
"Hawk-eyed" is a byword for visual acuity

The visual ability of birds of prey is legendary, and the keenness of their eyesight is due to a variety of factors. Raptors have large eyes for their size — on average from 1.4 to over 2 times larger than those of other birds of similar weight — and the eye is tube-shaped, producing a larger retinal image. In general, an eye's resolving power depends both on its optics — large eyes with large apertures suffer less from diffraction and can have larger retinal images due to a longer focal length — and on the density of receptor spacing in the retina. The more receptors an animal's retina has, the greater its visual acuity and the greater its ability to distinguish individual objects at a distance — especially when, as in raptors, each receptor is typically attached to a single ganglion. Many raptors have foveas with significantly more rods and cones than the human fovea (e.g., 65,000/mm^{2} in the American kestrel vs. 38,000/mm^{2} in humans), providing these birds spectacular long-distance vision. It has been proposed that the shape of raptors' deep central fovea can create a telephoto optical effect, increasing the size of the retinal image in the fovea and thereby increasing the spatial resolution. Behavioural studies show that some large-eyed raptors (e.g., wedge-tailed eagle, Old World vultures) have twice the spatial resolution of humans, though many medium- and small-sized raptors have a spatial resolution that is only comparable or lower.

Each retina of the black-chested buzzard-eagle has two foveae

The forward-facing eyes of a bird of prey give it binocular vision, which is assisted by a double fovea. The raptor's adaptations for optimum visual resolution (e.g., an American kestrel can see a 2–mm insect from the top of an 18–m tree) has a disadvantage in that its vision is poor in low light, so it must roost at night. Raptors may have to pursue mobile prey in the lower part of their visual field, and therefore do not have the lower-field myopia adaptation demonstrated by many other birds. Scavenging birds like vultures do not need such sharp vision, so a condor has only a single fovea with about 35,000 receptors per mm^{2}. Vultures, however have high physiological activity of many important enzymes to suit their distant clarity of vision. Also, crested caracara have only a single fovea, as this species forages on the ground for carrion and insects. However, they do have a higher degree of binocular overlap than other falcons, potentially enabling the caracara to manipulate objects, such as rocks, whilst foraging.

Like other birds investigated, raptors do also have coloured oil droplets in their cones. The generally brown, grey and white plumage of this group, and the absence of colour displays in courtship, suggests that colour is relatively unimportant to these birds.

In most raptors, a prominent eye ridge and its feathers extend above and in front of the eye. This "eyebrow" gives birds of prey their distinctive stare. The ridge physically protects the eye from wind, dust, and debris and shields it from excessive glare. The osprey lacks this ridge, although the arrangement of the feathers above its eyes serves a similar function; it also possesses dark feathers in front of the eye which probably serve to reduce the glare from the water surface when the bird is hunting for its staple diet of fish.

=== Nocturnal birds ===
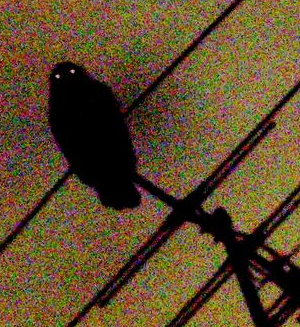
A powerful owl photographed at night showing reflective tapeta lucida

Owls have very large eyes for their size, 2.2 times greater than the average for birds of the same weight, and positioned at the front of the head. The eyes have a field overlap of 50–70%, giving better binocular vision than for diurnal birds of prey (overlap 30–50%). The tawny owl's retina has about 56,000 light-sensitive rods per square millimetre (36 million per square inch); although earlier claims that it could see in the infrared part of the spectrum have been dismissed.

Each owl's retina has a single fovea

Adaptations to night vision include the large size of the eye, its tubular shape, large numbers of closely packed retinal rods, and an absence of cones, since cone cells are not sensitive enough for a low-photon nighttime environment. There are few coloured oil droplets, which would reduce the light intensity, but the retina contains a reflective layer, the tapetum lucidum. This increases the amount of light each photosensitive cell receives, allowing the bird to see better in low light conditions. Owls normally have only one fovea, and that is poorly developed except in diurnal hunters like the short-eared owl.

Besides owls, bat hawks, frogmouths and nightjars also display good night vision. Some bird species nest deep in cave systems which are too dark for vision, and find their way to the nest with a simple form of echolocation. The oilbird is the only nocturnal bird to echolocate, but several Aerodramus swiftlets also utilise this technique, with one species, Atiu swiftlet, also using echolocation outside its caves.

=== Water birds ===
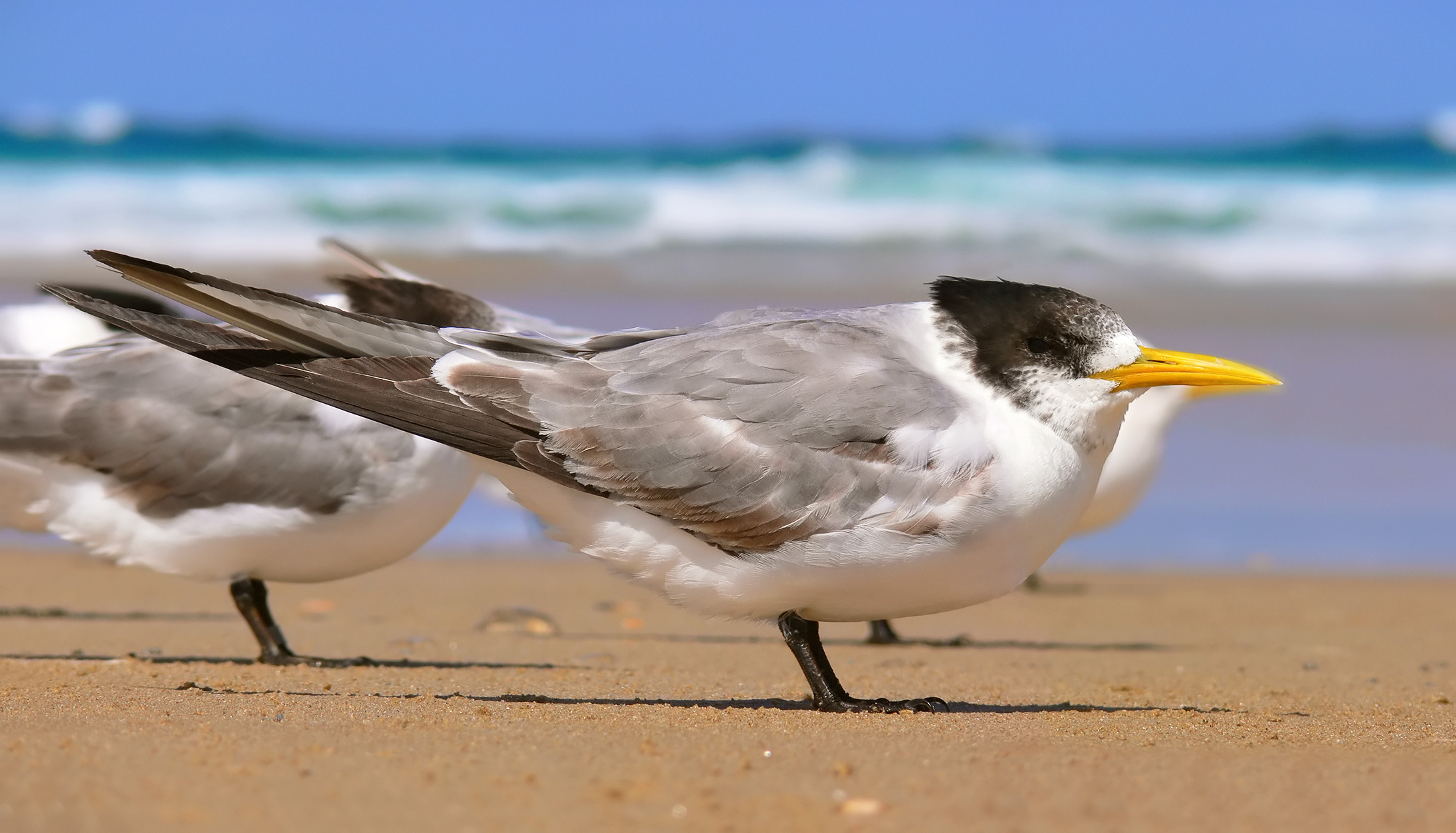
Terns have coloured oil droplets in the cones of the eye to improve distance vision

Seabirds such as terns and gulls that feed at the surface or plunge for food have red oil droplets in the cones of their retinas. This improves contrast and sharpens distance vision, especially in hazy conditions. Birds that have to look through an air/water interface have more deeply coloured carotenoid pigments in the oil droplets than other species.

This helps them to locate shoals of fish, although it is uncertain whether they are sighting the phytoplankton on which the fish feed, or other feeding birds.

Birds that fish by stealth from above the water have to correct for refraction particularly when the fish are observed at an angle. Reef herons and little egrets appear to be able to make the corrections needed when capturing fish and are more successful in catching fish when strikes are made at an acute angle and this higher success may be due to the inability of the fish to detect their predators. Other studies indicate that egrets work within a preferred angle of strike and that the probability of misses increase when the angle becomes too far from the vertical leading to an increased difference between the apparent and real depth of prey.

Birds that pursue fish under water like auks and divers have far fewer red oil droplets, but they have special flexible lenses and use the nictitating membrane as an additional lens. This allows greater optical accommodation for good vision in air and water. Cormorants have a greater range of visual accommodation, at 50 dioptres, than any other bird, but the kingfishers are considered to have the best all-round (air and water) vision.

Each retina of the Manx shearwater has one fovea and an elongated strip of high photoreceptor density

Tubenosed seabirds, which come ashore only to breed and spend most of their life wandering close to the surface of the oceans, have a long narrow area of visual sensitivity on the retina This region, the area giganto cellularis, has been found in the Manx shearwater, Kerguelen petrel, great shearwater, broad-billed prion and common diving-petrel. It is characterised by the presence of ganglion cells which are regularly arrayed and larger than those found in the rest of the retina, and morphologically appear similar to the cells of the retina in cats. The location and cellular morphology of this novel area suggests a function in the detection of items in a small binocular field projecting below and around the bill. It is not concerned primarily with high spatial resolution, but may assist in the detection of prey near the sea surface as a bird flies low over it.

The Manx shearwater, like many other seabirds, visits its breeding colonies at night to reduce the chances of attack by aerial predators. Two aspects of its optical structure suggest that the eye of this species is adapted to vision at night. In the shearwater's eyes the lens does most of the bending of light necessary to produce a focused image on the retina. The cornea, the outer covering of the eye, is relative flat and so of low refractive power. In a diurnal bird like the pigeon, the reverse is true; the cornea is highly curved and is the principal refractive component. The ratio of refraction by the lens to that by the cornea is 1.6 for the shearwater and 0.4 for the pigeon; the figure for the shearwater is consistent with that for a range of nocturnal birds and mammals.

The shorter focal length of shearwater eyes give them a smaller, but brighter, image than is the case for pigeons, so the latter has sharper daytime vision. Although the Manx shearwater has adaptations for night vision, the effect is small, and it is likely that these birds also use smell and hearing to locate their nests.

It used to be thought that penguins were far-sighted on land. Although the cornea is flat and adapted to swimming underwater, the lens is very strong and can compensate for the reduced corneal focusing when out of water. Almost the opposite solution is used by the hooded merganser which can bulge part of the lens through the iris when submerged.

== See also ==
- Visual system
- Bird cognition
- Bird Vision Band
