= Oil droplet =

Small column of oil

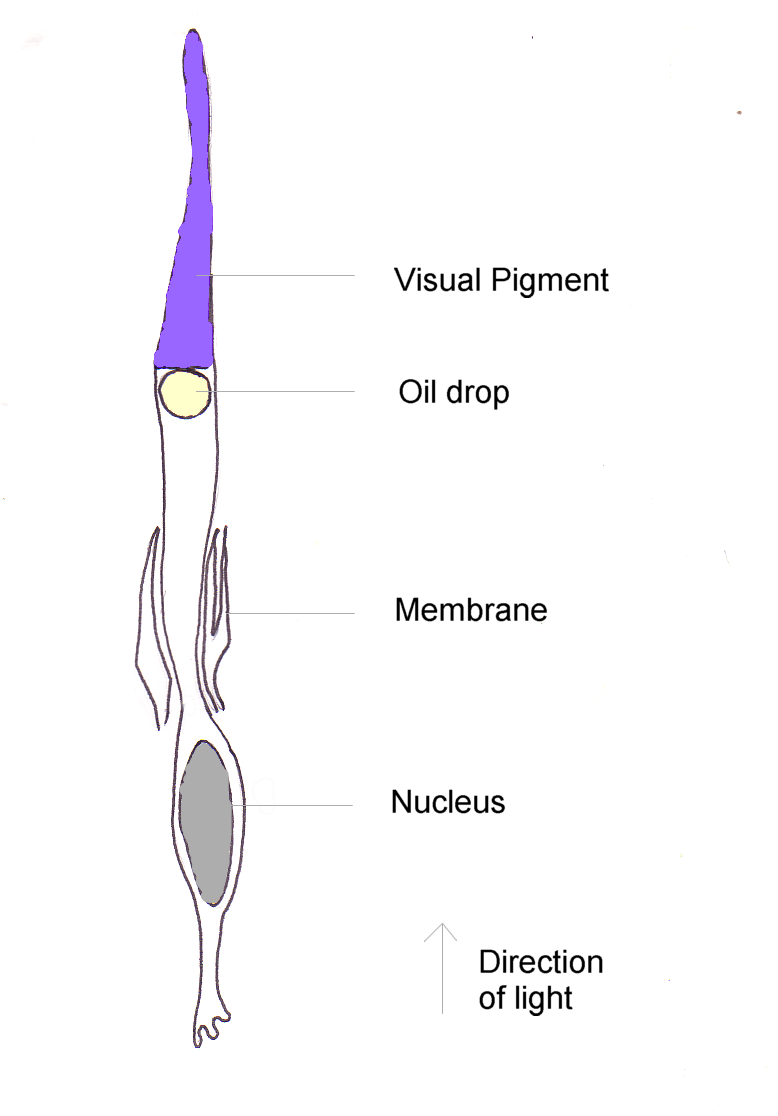
Bird cone cell, including oil droplet.

Oil droplets are found in the eyes of some animals, being located in the photoreceptor cells. They are especially common in the eyes of diurnal (active during the day) reptiles (e.g. lizards, turtles) and birds (see bird vision), though are present in other taxa such as lungfish. They are found in cone cells far more often than in rods, suggesting a role in colour vision. Occurrence in rod cells may imply that they have been modified from a cone cell ancestor. They occasionally occur in double cones/double rods. Some oil droplets are coloured, while others appear colourless. They are located in the cone inner segment, where they intercept and filter light before it can pass through to the cone outer segment where the opsins are, the molecules that sense light.

The adaptive advantage of oil droplets is not firmly established. Coloured oil droplets have a cost in that they reduce the amount of light available to the visual system. They also reduce the overlap in spectral sensitivity between different types of cone (e.g. short wavelength sensitive, medium wavelength sensitive etc.). This can be a benefit because it increases the number of colours that can be discriminated, and calculations by Vorobyev (2003) support the hypothesis that this is of net benefit.
