= Pecten oculi =

Blood vessel structure in bird eyes

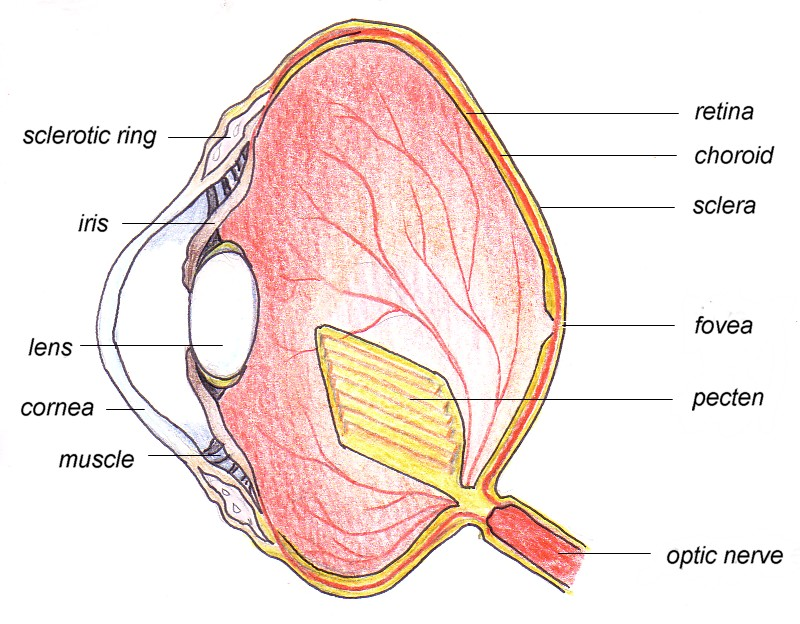
Diagram showing the position of the pecten oculi within a bird eye

The pecten or pecten oculi (Latin for "comb of the eye") is a comb-like structure of blood vessels belonging to the choroid in the eye of a bird, and no other species. It is a non-sensory, pigmented structure that projects freely into the vitreous humor from the point where the optic nerve enters the eyeball, and undulates with movements of the vitreous humor. It almost entirely covers up the optic disc.

Histologically, it contains three types of tissues: a plexus of modified blood vessels, darkly pigmented cells interdigitated between the blood vessels, and supporting tissue. The supporting tissue is glial and syncytium, and derived from the optic disc. There are no muscle, nerve fibers, or sensory tissue. The arterial blood is supplied by a branch of the hyaloid artery emerging from the optic disc entirely separate from the choroidal circulation. The artery runs along the base of the pecten and sends ascending branches to each of the folds. Melanin is abundant at the apical and peripheral pecten, produced by pleomorphic melanocytes that form incomplete sheaths along the plexus of capillaries.

More than 30 functions have been proposed for the pecten. The most commonly accepted theory is that it provides nutrition to the retina, and controls the pH of the vitreous body. High levels of alkaline phosphatase and carbonic anhydrase activity in the pecten oculi have been linked to the transport of nutrient molecules from the highly vascularized choroid into vitreous and retinal cells, thus nourishing the eye. Saccadic eye movements caused the pecten to oscillate, fanning the liquid in the vitreous. This suggests that saccade and the pecten co-evolved to diffuse metabolites such as oxygen and glucose out from the pecten.

In most vertebrate eyes, there are blood vessels in front of the retina, partially obscuring the image. In most avians, the retina is completely free of blood vessels, leading to the extremely sharp eyesight of birds such as hawks. The retina is supplied instead by the choroid and the pecten. The pigmentation of the pecten is believed to protect the blood vessels against damage from ultraviolet light. Stray light absorption by melanin granules of pecten oculi is also considered to give rise to small increments in temperature of pecten and eye; this may offer increased metabolic rate to optimize eye physiology in low temperatures at high-altitude flights.

== History ==
It was first noted by Nicolas Steno in 1673 in developing chicken embryo, though it was an incorrect description and interpretation. It was then correctly described and interpreted by Perrault (1676) whose observation was elaborated by Petit (1735).

There was also an anatomical description of the eye of an eagle in 1681, which was quoted from a description by Ola Borch in 1674. Early alternative names included the pecten plicatum and the marsupium, mentioned in a paper by Crampton, who argued that the pecten could not have been used in visual accommodation, because it has no muscles connecting to the lens. Instead, it was due to a ciliary muscle (which he discovered) that attaches to the inner lamella of the cornea and the scleral ring.

For the detailed history, see.

== Comparative anatomy ==
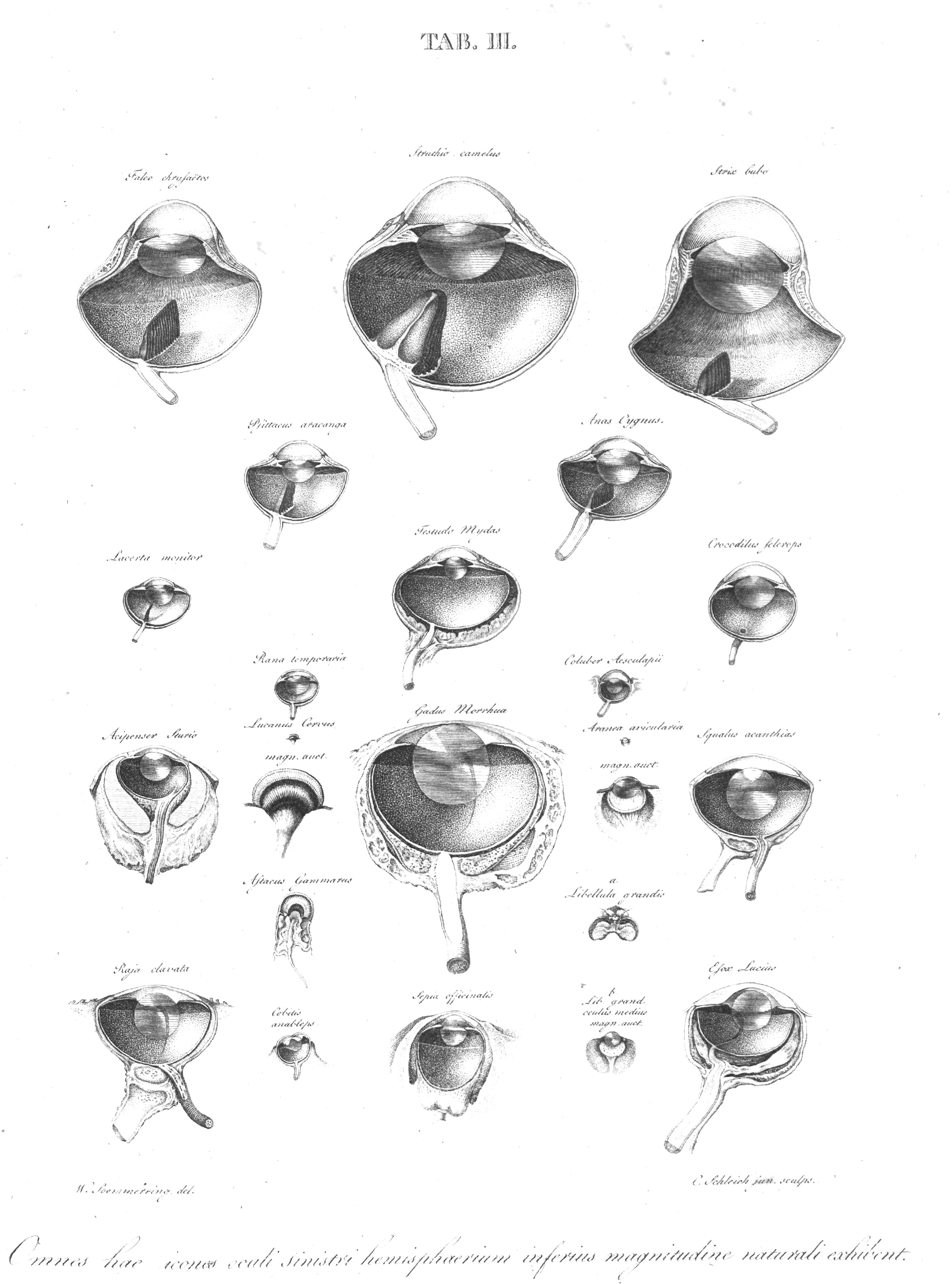
The horizontal section diagrams of different forms of eyes. The top left is of an eagle (Falco chrysaëtos), and shows the pleated shape. The top middle is of an ostrich (Struthio camelus), and shows the vaned shape. In some, like the Anas cygnus, the pectan almost touching the lens.

The structure varies across bird species. The conical type is only reported in the brown kiwi (Apteryx mantelli). The vaned type is reported in many palaeognaths, such as ostriches (Struthio camelus) and rheas (Rhea americana). The pleated type is reported in most other birds, including most neognaths and the cassowary (which is a palaeognath). See Plate XII at page 411 for examples.

The conical type looks similar to the conus papillaris, and is a simple cone rising up from the base on a circular optic disc. It has no folds. It is trumpet-shaped and heavily brown-black in color. It almost touches the lens.

The vaned type looks like a thin sheet rising up from the base over an oval-shaped optic disc. There are 25-30 thin folds extending out from the sheet. The folds are roughly trapezoidal, short on the top and long on the base. See Figure 507 for an example.

The pleated type looks like an accordion. The base is longer than the top. There is usually a ridge at the top called the "bridge", which keeps the accordion shorter at the top. If the pectan is cut off from the retina at the base, then its bridge is cut off, then it can be flattened to a flat sheet. Owls, Podargus, and Haliaeetus albicilla do not have the bridge. In the Alcedo atthis japonica, the crest of each pleat contains 1 to 3 membranous extensions that resemble the vaned type.

The pectens tend to be larger and have more folds in diurnal birds than nocturnal birds. The number of pleats varies between 5 and 30. In predators the folds are thicker but fewer (13 to 17). Sea-birds and shore-birds tend to have fewer pleats (≤ 12).

In the owl Bubo virginianus, it projects out into the vitreous cavity 5–6 mm, whereas in the dove Leucosarcia picata, it reaches almost as far anteriorly as the equatorial lens.

=== In other species ===
In some reptiles, the retina is avascular, and is fed nutrients by the conus papillaris. The conus is homologous to the pecten, and is similar in shape as the conical type of the pecten oculi. In teleosts, the retina is also avascular, and is fed nutrients by the choroidal gland, the falciform process, and the preretinal vascular plexus. Of these, the falciform process is similar in form to the conus. The falciform process protrudes from the optic disc, is essential for retinal nutrition, and is an origination site for the musculus retractor lentis, which allows accommodation. Fish lens is hard and does not change shape. Contraction of the muscle pulls the lens inwards, allowing the fish to focus on more distant objects.

Most of the primates also possess a small bump on the optic disc, which is termed the papilla nervi optici. Amongst mammals, vestiges of a structure similar to the conic pecten oculi can occasionally be observed in marsupials.

Some mammals, such as guinea pigs and brushtail possum, have nearly avascular retina. Since they also do not have the pecten, the retina is supplied entirely from the choroid. This limits their retinas to be significantly thinner than in mammals with vascular retina.

== Gallery ==
Various pecten oculi in various species. Watercolor painting based on handheld opthalmoscopy in living organisms.
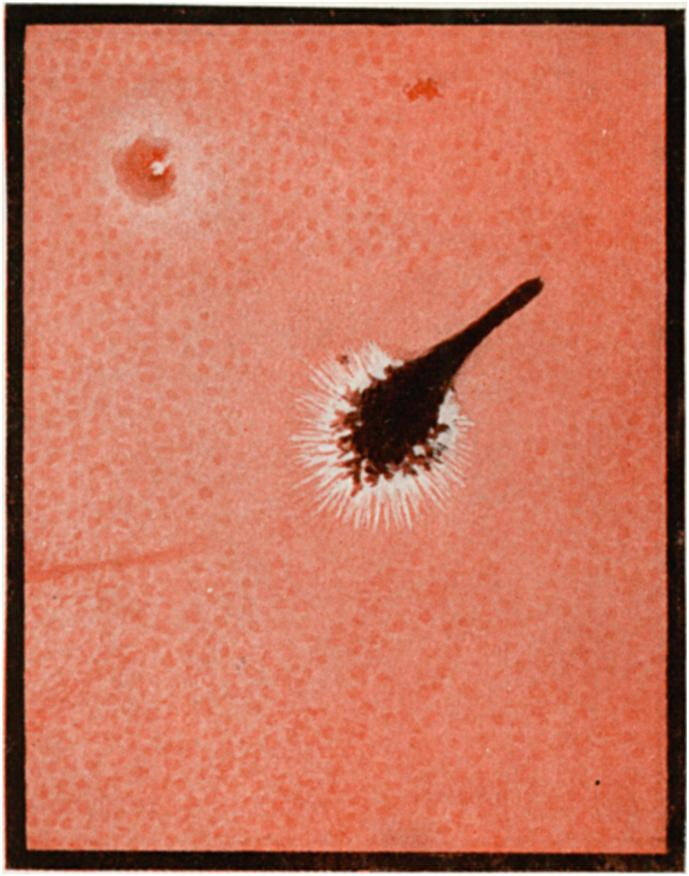
Apteryx

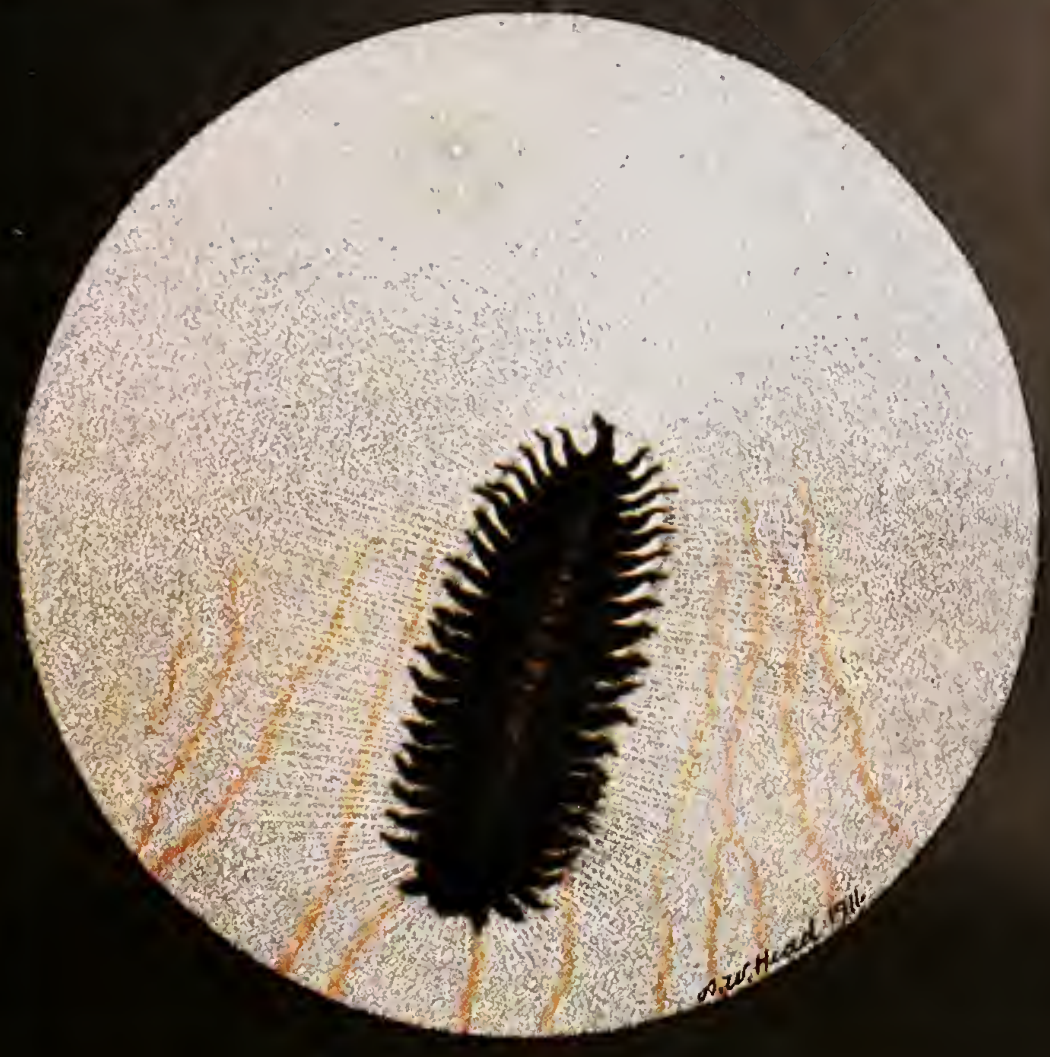
Martineta tinamou, Calodroma elegans

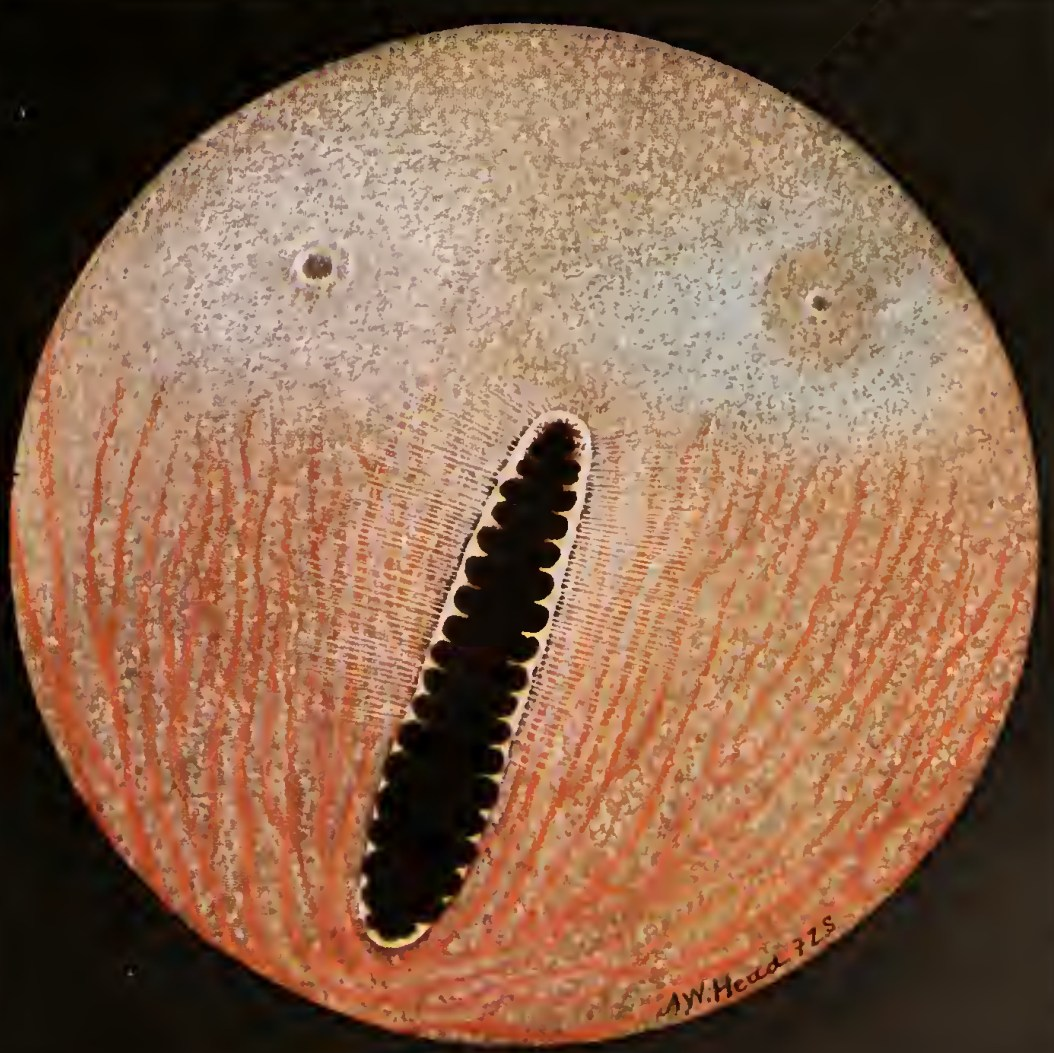
Heliaëtus leucogaster

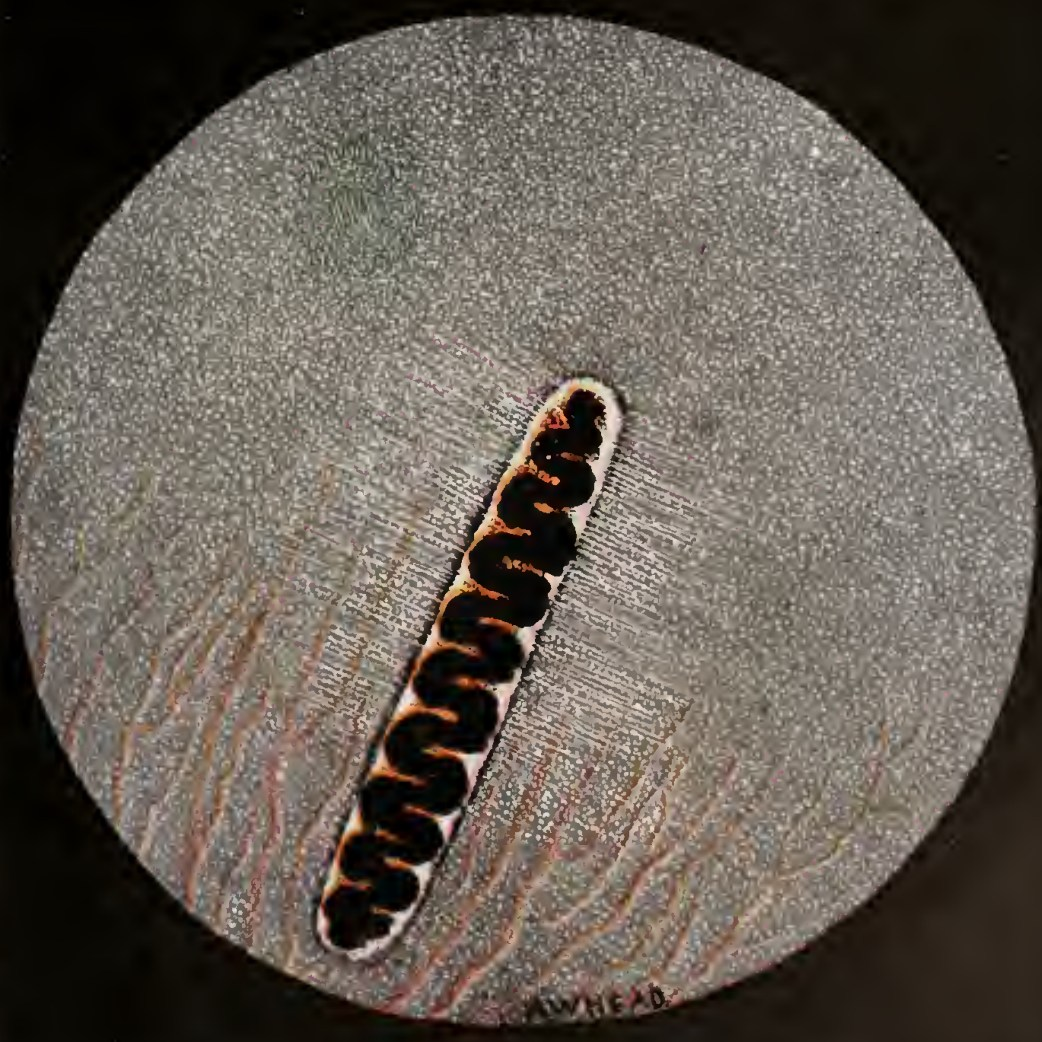
Nycticorax nycticorax

== See also ==
- Conus papillaris, a similar structure found in reptiles
- Bergmeister's papilla
