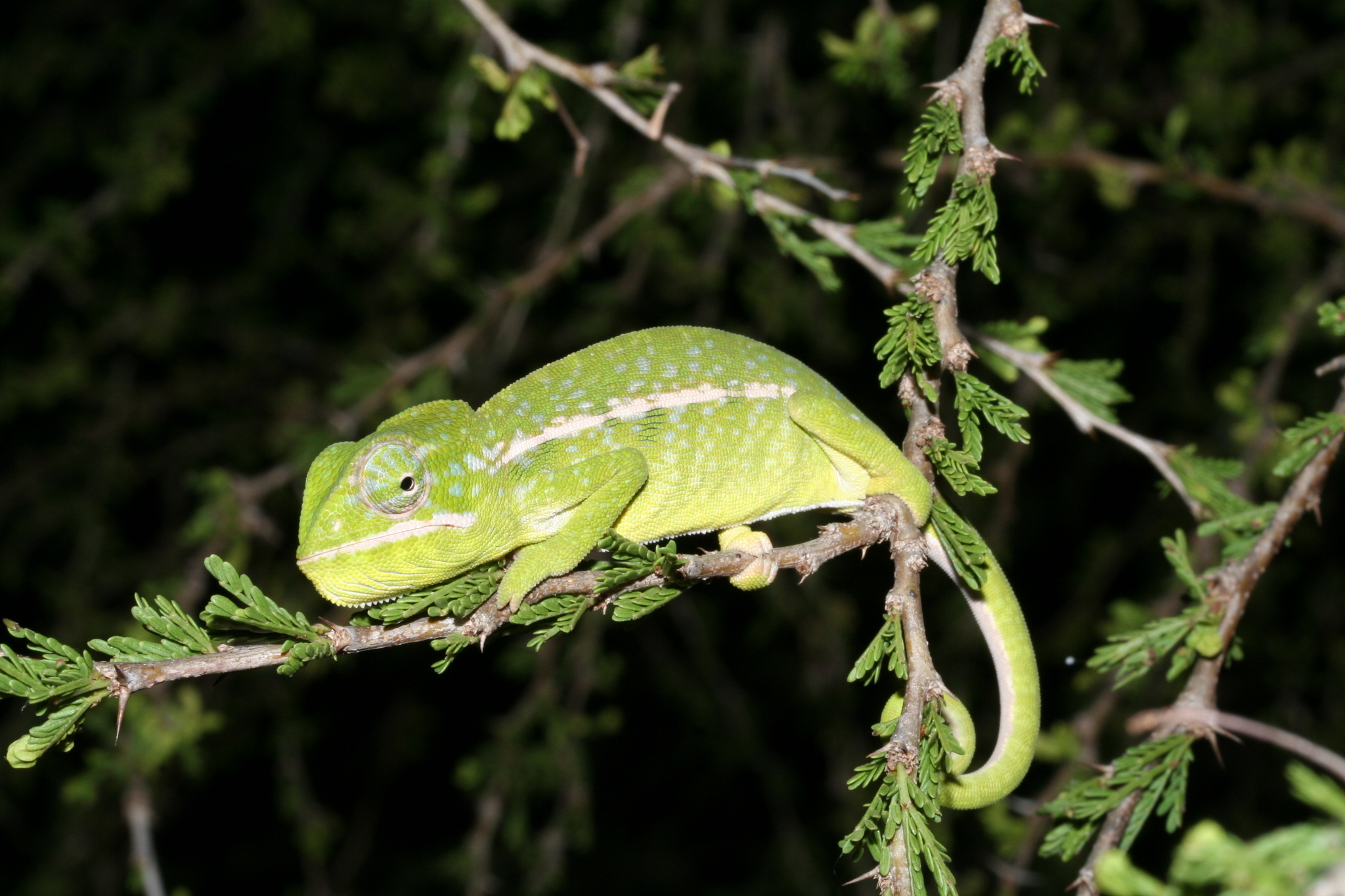

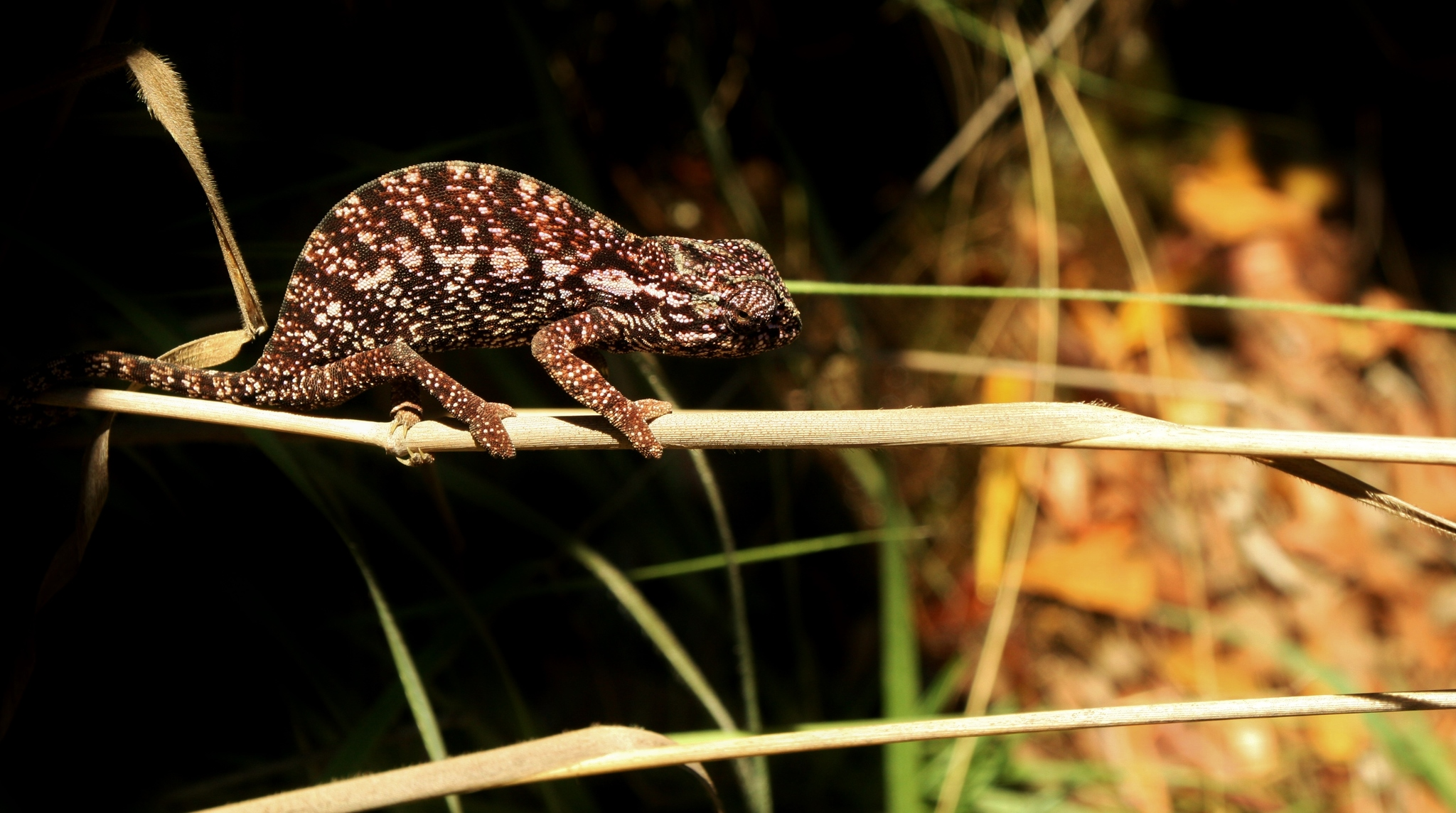

Conservation status
- Least Concern (IUCN 3.1)

Scientific classification
- Kingdom: Animalia
- Phylum: Chordata
- Class: Reptilia
- Order: Squamata
- Suborder: Iguania
- Family: Chamaeleonidae
- Genus: Furcifer
- Species: F. major

Binomial name
- Furcifer major (Brygoo, 1971)
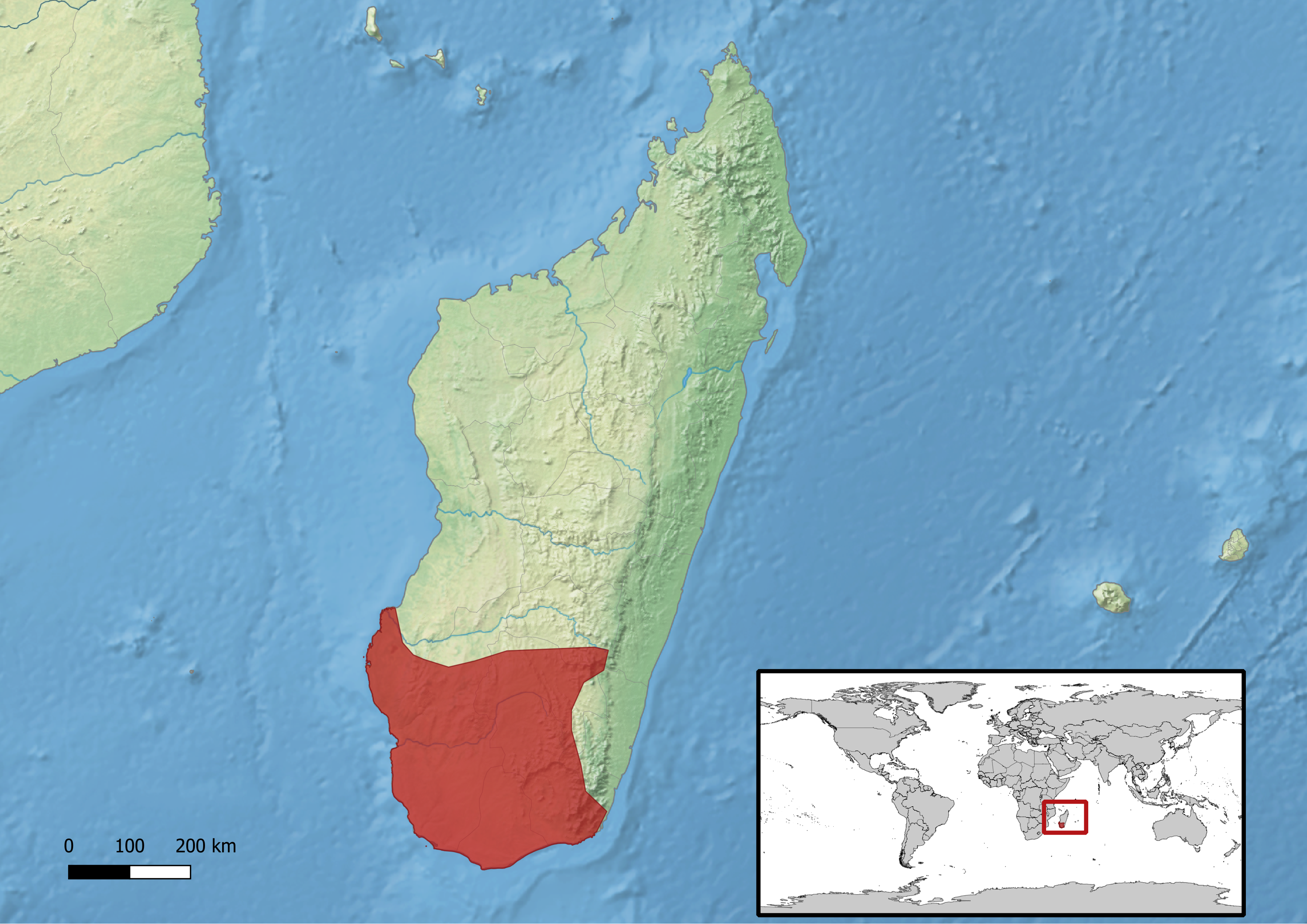

= Furcifer major =

Species of lizard

Furcifer major, the southern carpet chameleon, is a species of chameleon found in various dry habitats of southern Madagascar. It was formerly considered a part of Furcifer lateralis.
