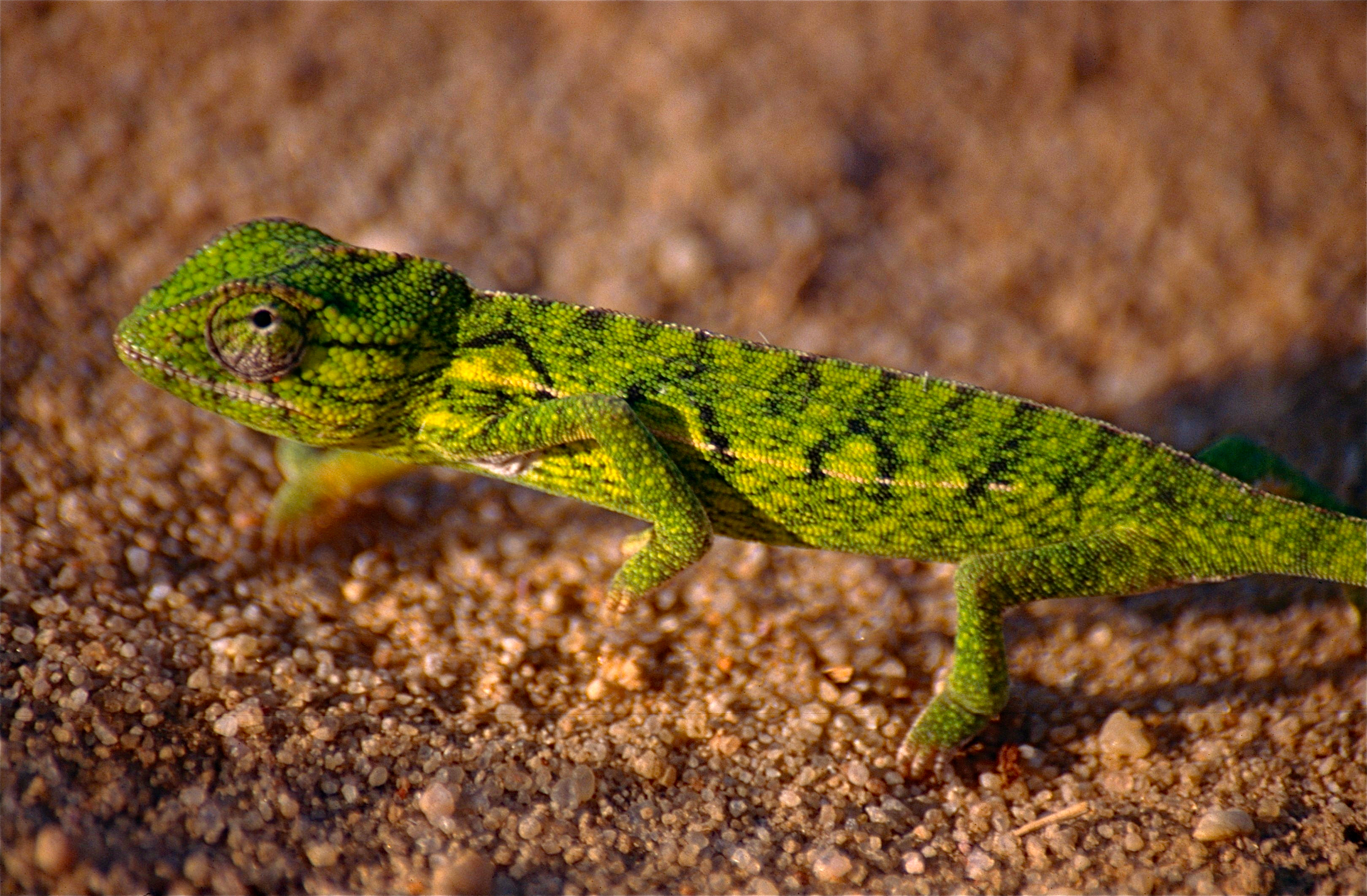

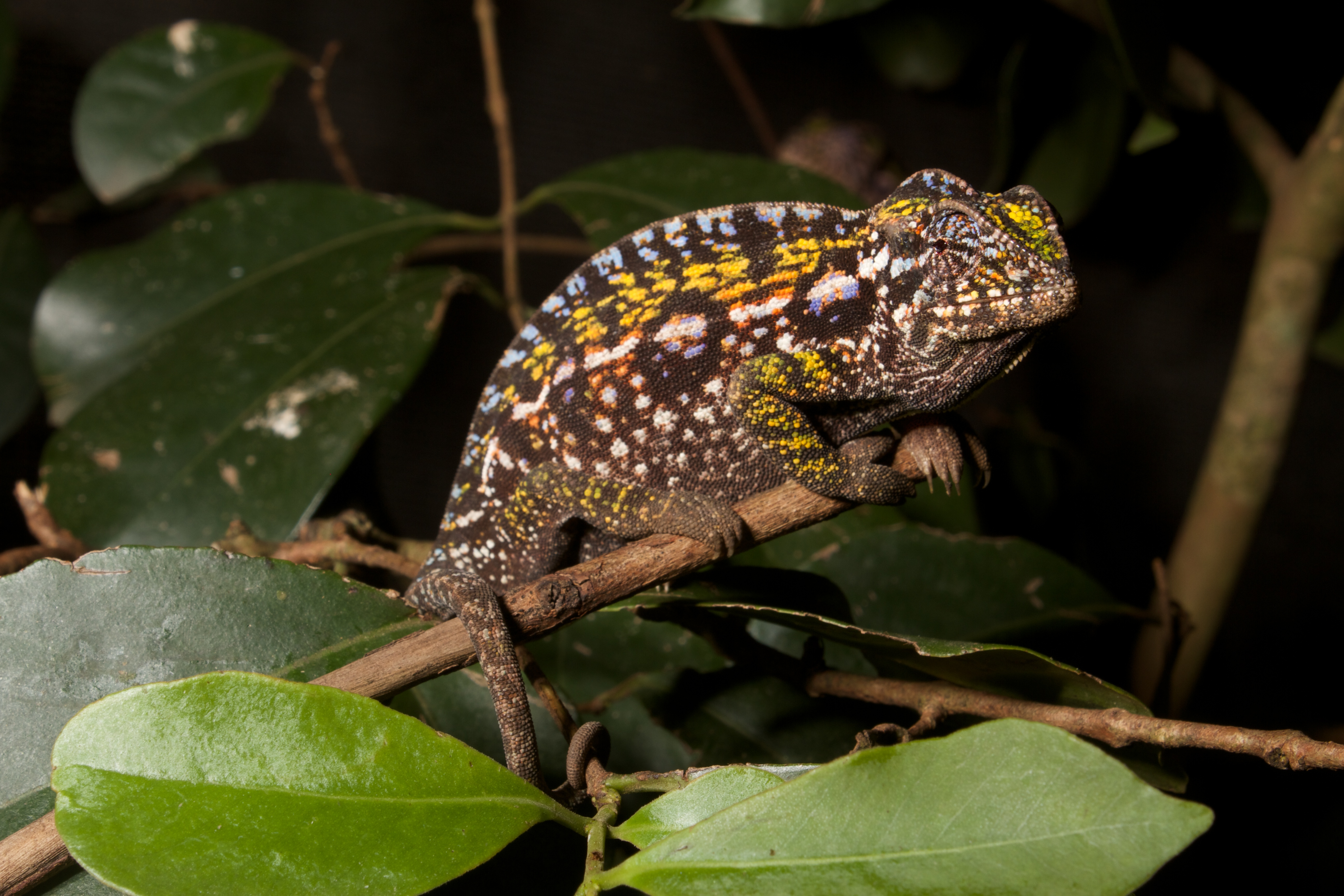
- male above, female below

Conservation status
- Least Concern (IUCN 3.1)

Scientific classification
- Kingdom: Animalia
- Phylum: Chordata
- Class: Reptilia
- Order: Squamata
- Suborder: Iguania
- Family: Chamaeleonidae
- Genus: Furcifer
- Species: F. lateralis

Binomial name
- Furcifer lateralis (Gray, 1831)

Synonyms
- Chamaeleo lateralis Gray, 1831; Chamaeleo lambertoni Angel, 1921

= Carpet chameleon =

Species of lizard

The carpet chameleon (Furcifer lateralis), also known as the jewel chameleon or white-lined chameleon, is a species of chameleon that is endemic to eastern Madagascar. It is a relatively small chameleon and especially females tend to have bright markings in many colours, whereas males are mostly green and whitish or green and yellowish.

Two populations formerly included in this species are now recognized as separate: the larger and less strongly coloured F. major from southern Madagascar, and the typically greenish (it is not generally found in a dark, blackish form) F. viridis from western and northern Madagascar.

== Distribution, habitat and conservation ==
Furcifer lateralis can be found in eastern Madagascar. It can be found between 120 and 1,925 metres (394 and 6,316 ft) above sea level, and inhabits forests, shrubby areas, grasslands and well-vegetated gardens.

The range of this common species covers more than 130,000 km^{2} (50,000 sq mi). It tolerates some habitat degradation and is regarded as Least Concern by the IUCN. There is an annual quota of individuals allowed to be collected for the pet trade.

== Appearance ==
Both sexes of Furcifer lateralis can reach total length of 17 to 25 cm (6.7–9.8 in). The males are largely green with some whitish, yellowish and dark markings. Females are heavier-bodied and darker (more blackish or occasionally reddish, less green) with markings that can be a wider range of colours, including blackish, white, blue, yellow and orange. Both sexes have stripy throats and lips, and the side of their body has a lateral line and several ring-like markings. They can change their colour depending on their mood (pregnant females in particular are strongly marked) and environmental factors and they usually start the day with a dark colour to enable them to warm up rapidly by exposing themselves to sunlight.

== Life cycle ==
Furcifer lateralis is a relatively fast-maturing and short-lived species of chameleon. They are already able to breed about three months after hatching from the egg, but rarely–if ever–surpass an age of three years. Females lay between eight and twenty-three eggs at one time, and can produce up to three clutches a year. The eggs have to be maintained at a steady temperature of about 24 °C (75 °F) and hatch after half a year.
