= Choroidal artery =

Choroidal artery can refer to:

- Anterior choroidal artery (arteria chorioidea anterior)
- Posterior choroidal artery, branches from the posterior cerebral artery (arteria cerebri posterior)
