= Double cone (biology) =

Double cones (DCs), known as twin cones when the two members are the same, are two cone cells (colour detecting photoreceptors) joined together that may also be coupled optically/electrically. They are the most common type of cone cells in fish, reptiles, birds, and monotremes such as the platypus and are present in most vertebrates, though they are absent in most placental mammals (including humans), elasmobranchs, and catfish. There are many gap junctions between the cells of fish double cones. If they have a unique function compared to single cones, it is unknown. Proposed uses include achromatic (non-colour vision) tasks such as visually perceiving luminance, motion, and polarization.

Some double cones have the same opsin (twin cones), while others combine different cone types with different spectral sensitivity. Behavioural research on the reef dwelling triggerfish Rhinecanthus aculeatus has provided evidence that individual members of double cones can act as independent channels of colour information.

In regards to vision in fishes, Bowmaker (1990) writes that double cones tend to be sensitive to longer wavelengths of light than single cones, and that the single cones are usually smaller than the individual members of the double cones.
