= Ophthalmotrope =

Apparatus for demonstrating the movements of the eye

An ophthalmotrope is an apparatus for demonstrating the movements of the eye and the action of the different muscles which produce them, consisting essentially of a model eyeball to which are attached strings and pulleys to duplicate the line force of the muscles. Movements of the eye are kinematically complex and can be described as a combination of rotations about changing rotation centers. But even when ocular mechanics are simplified to pure rotations about a head-fixed rotation center, their noncommutative property makes them difficult to visualize. Ruete, Listing, Donders, Helmholtz, von Graefe, Volkmann and many others have provided the broad outline of an answer to the question how the eye rotates during eye movements.

== History ==
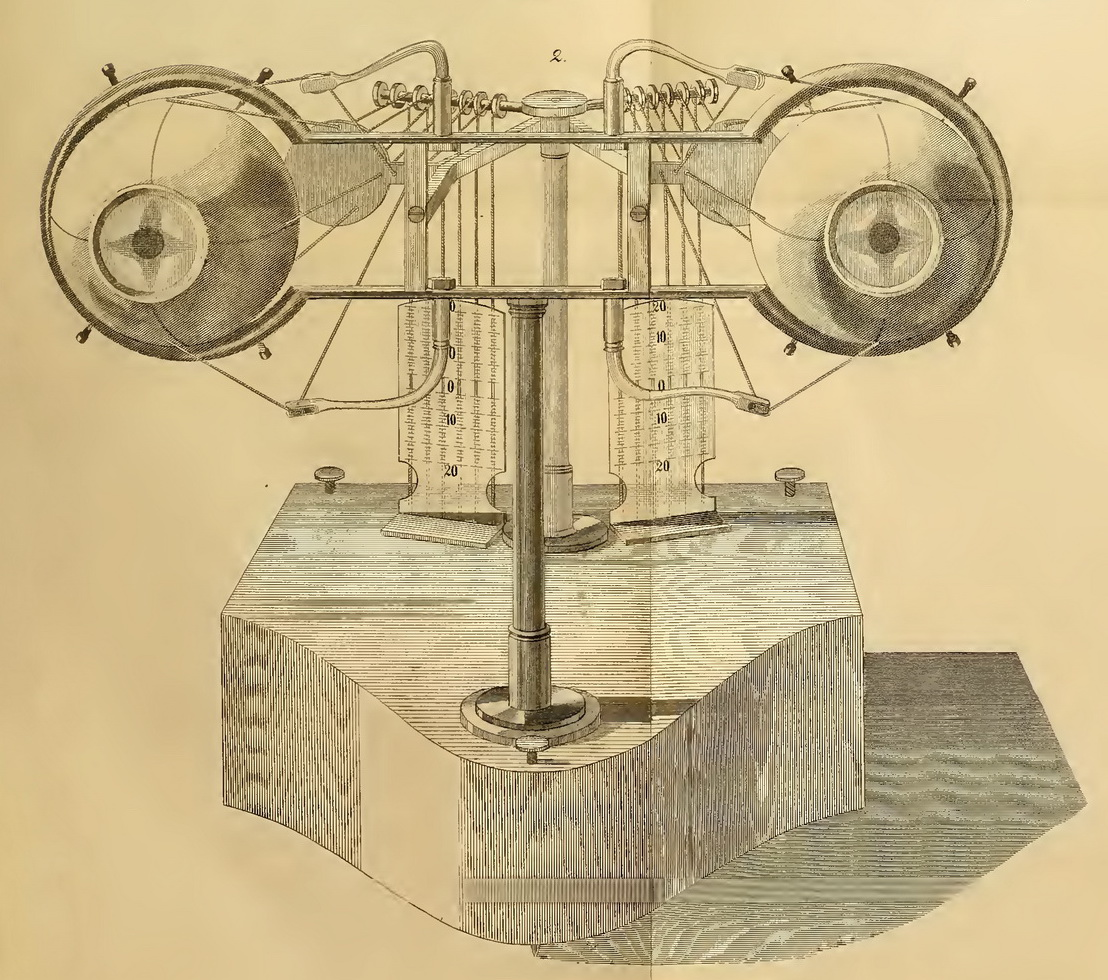
Ruete's Ophthalmotrope 2nd model, 1857

Historically, mechanical representations of oculomotor mechanics have been used for visualization of eye movements and their interaction with visual geometry. Many mechanical models of eye movements have been constructed and studied in the nineteenth century. The first ophthalmotrope was made by Christian Georg Theodor Ruete in 1845 and it was he who gave it the name "ophthalmotrope". Ruete's first version ophthalmotrope had the eye mounted in nested gimbals, and his second model, which emulated Listing's law, mounted the rotation axis in a rotatable ring. Ruete's second model of 1857 was an altogether more sophisticated model that demonstrates both the movements of the eye and, importantly, the action of the ocular muscles. Both Donders's and Listing's laws can be demonstrated on this model. The degree of muscle contraction or extension can be measured on a scale at the back of the model. Other ophthalmotropes were designed later by Landolt, Knapp, Donders, Snellen, Wundt, and others. Recently, Schreiber and Schor have published a modern software version of ophthalmotrope. They presented a virtual gimbaled model of the oculomotor system, which provides accurate visualization of the kinematics of the three major oculomotor coordinate systems and qualitative estimates of the effects of the different coordinate systems on ocular torsion. The virtual ophthalmotrope presented by Schreiber and Schor is a modification and extension of Donders' design, by adding Listing's extended law and displacement plane geometry to its basic visualization capabilities.
