= Anesthesia for eye surgery =

Ocular surgery may be performed under topical, local or general anesthesia. Local anaesthesia is more preferred because it is economical, easy to perform and the risk involved is less. Local anaesthesia has a rapid onset of action and provides a dilated pupil with low intraocular pressure.

== Topical (Surface) anaesthesia ==
Surface anaesthesia is given by instillation of 2.5 ml xylocaine. One drop of xylocaine instilled four times after every 4 minutes will produce conjunctival and corneal anaesthesia. Paracaine, tetracaine, bupivacaine, lidocaine etc. may also be used in place of xylocaine. Cataract surgery by phacoemulsification is frequently performed under surface anaesthesia. Facial nerve, which supplies the orbicularis oculi muscle, is blocked in addition for intraocular surgeries. Topical anaesthesia is known to cause endothelial and epithelial toxicity, allergy and surface keratopathy.

=== Facial block ===
There are four types of facial block : van Lint's block, Atkinson block, O' Brien block and Nadbath block.

- van Lint's block : In van Lint's block, the peripheral branches of facial nerve are blocked. This technique causes akinesia of orbicularis oculi muscle without associated facial paralysis. Anaesthetic is injected just above the eyebrow and below the inferior orbital margin, through a point about 2 cm behind the lateral orbital margin in level with the outer canthus of the eye.
- O' Brien's block : It is also known as facial nerve trunk block. The block is done at the level of the neck of the mandible near the condyloid process. The needle is inserted at this point and about 4 ml of local anaesthetic is injected while withdrawing the needle. Pain at the injection site may occur if O' Brien's block is applied.
- Atkinson's block : The superior branch of the facial nerve is blocked by injecting the anaesthetic solution at the inferior margin of zygomatic bone.
- Nadbath block : In Nadbath block, the facial nerve is blocked at the stylomastoid foramen. The patient is likely to experience pain.

=== Retrobulbar block ===
This technique was first practiced by Herman Knapp in 1884. Here, 2% xylocaine is introduced into the muscle cone behind the eyeball. The injection is usually given through the inferior fornix of the skin of the outer part of the lower lid when the eye is in primary gaze. The ciliary nerves, ciliary ganglion, oculomotor nerve and abducens nerve are anesthetized in retrobulbar block. As a result, global akinesia, anaesthesia and analgesia are produced. The superior oblique muscle, which is outside the muscle cone, is not usually paralyzed. The complications of retrobulbar block are globe perforation, optic nerve injury, retrobulbar haemorrhage and extraocular muscle palsy. Retrobulbar anaesthesia is contraindicated in posterior staphyloma, high axial myopia and enophthalmos.

=== Peribulbar block ===
This technique was first applied by Davis. In peribulbar block, local anaesthetic is injected to the peripheral spaces of the orbit. The anaesthetic diffuses into the muscle cone and eyelids, causing global and orbicularis akinesia and anaesthesia. After injection, orbital compression is applied for around 15 minutes.

== Regional (local) anaesthesia ==
Nearly all ocular surgeries viz keratoplasty, cataract extraction, glaucoma surgery, iridectomy, strabismus, retinal detachment surgery etc. can be done under regional anaesthesia. Conjunctiva, globe and orbicularis can be paralysed using a combination of surface anaesthesia, facial anaesthesia and retrobulbar block. The advantage is that it produces less post-operative restlessness. It has less post-operative lung complications and less bleeding.

== General anaesthesia ==
General anaesthesia is preferred for ocular surgeries in anxious adults, psychiatric patients, infants and children. It is also indicated in perforating ocular injuries and major surgeries like exenteration. During the surgery, it has to be ensured that no carbon dioxide retention occurs. If this occurs, the choroid swells up and ocular contents may prolapse as soon as the eye is opened. The advantages of general anaesthesia is that it produces complete akinesia, controlled intraocular pressure and safe operating environment. It is the safest option for bilateral surgery. The complications of general anaesthesia are laryngospasm, hypotension, hypercarbia, respiratory depression and cardiac arrhythmia.

== History ==
Susruta Samhita has evidences of use of anaesthesia for ocular surgeries. Inhalational anaesthesia was used for this purpose. Egyptian surgeons used carotid compression to produce transient ischemia during eye surgery to reduce the perception of pain. In 1884, Karl Koller used cocaine for ocular surgery. The same year, Herman Knapp used cocaine for retrobulbar block. In 1914, van Lint achieved orbicularis akinesia by local injection.

== See also ==
- Ocular surgery
