= Ruete =

Ruete is a surname. Notable people with the surname include:

- Christian Georg Theodor Ruete (1810–1867), German ophthalmologist
- Emily Ruete (1844–1924), Princess of Zanzibar and Oman
- Javier Silva Ruete (1935–2012), Peruvian politician, lawyer, and economist
- Julián Ruete (1887–1939), Spanish football player, referee, coach and manager

== See also ==
- Rüte
