= Jacob Hermann Knapp =

German-American ophthalmologist and otolaryngologist

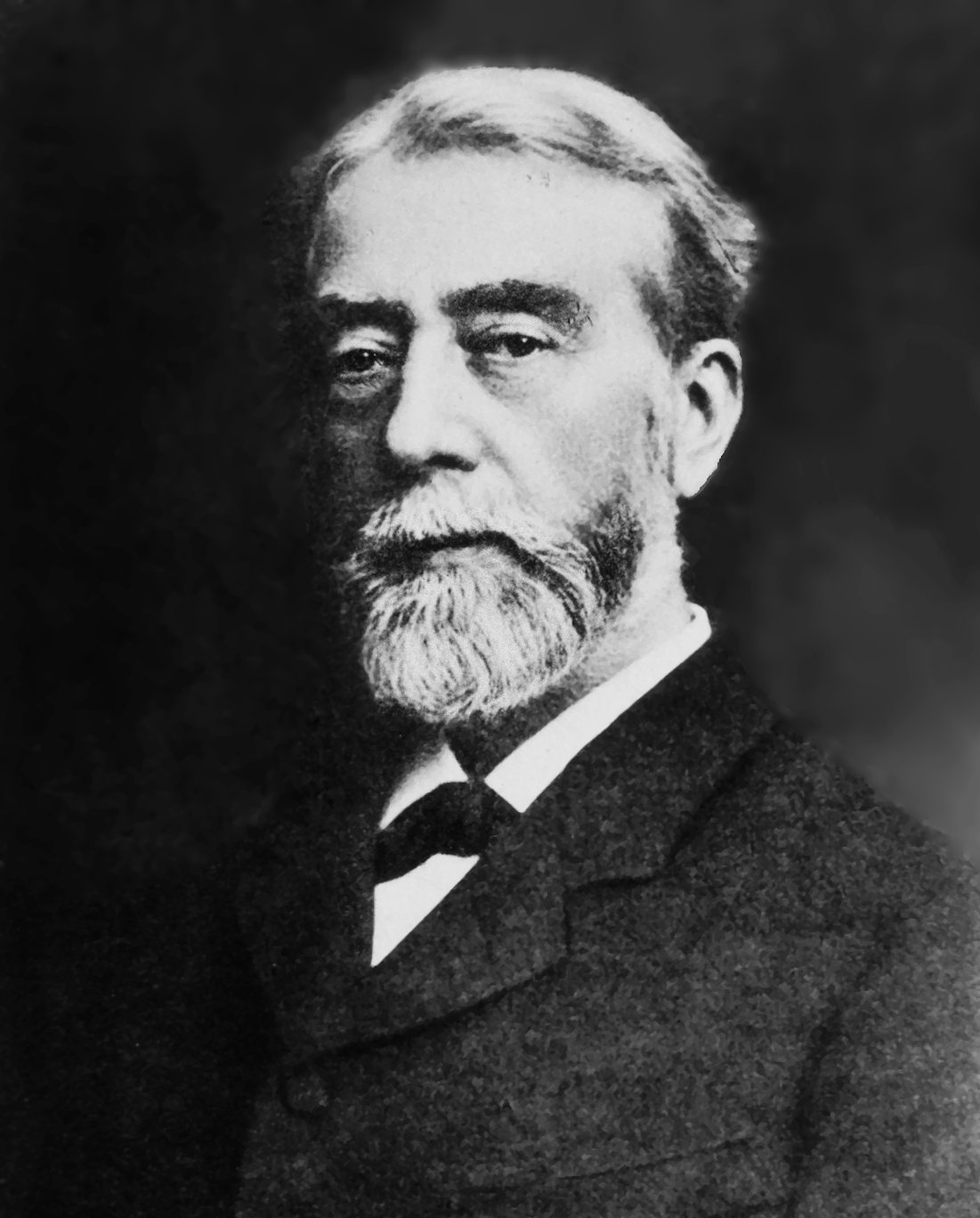
- Born: March 17, 1832; Hünfelden, Duchy of Nassau
- Died: April 30, 1911 (aged 79); Mamaroneck, New York, US
- Education: University of Giessen
- Occupations: Surgeon, ophthalmologist
- Spouse(s): Adolfine Becker (1842-1872); Hedwig Sacksofsky (1852-1886)
- Children: Ida Caroline Knapp (1866-1933); Arnold Knapp (1869-1956); Cornelia Knapp (1870-1875); Maud E Knapp (1879-1960); Elisabeth Knapp (1882-1892)

Jacob Hermann Knapp (March 17, 1832 – April 30, 1911), also known as Hermann Knapp, was a German-American ophthalmologist and otolaryngologist.

== Biography ==
Knapp was born in Dauborn, Nassau. He earned his medical degree from the University of Giessen in 1854. As a young physician he studied with Franciscus Cornelis Donders in Utrecht, William Bowman in London, Albrecht von Graefe in Berlin and Hermann von Helmholtz in Heidelberg. From 1860 until 1868 he was a professor of ophthalmology at Heidelberg.

He emigrated to New York City, where he worked as a surgeon. In 1869 he founded the New York Ophthalmic and Aural Institute, which from 1913 to 1939 was called the Herman Knapp Memorial Hospital. In 1882, he was made professor of the New York University Medical College. In 1888, he was appointed professor of ophthalmology at the College of Physicians and Surgeons, Columbia University, and in 1902 he became emeritus professor. His son, Arnold Knapp (1869–1956) was also a noted ophthalmologist.

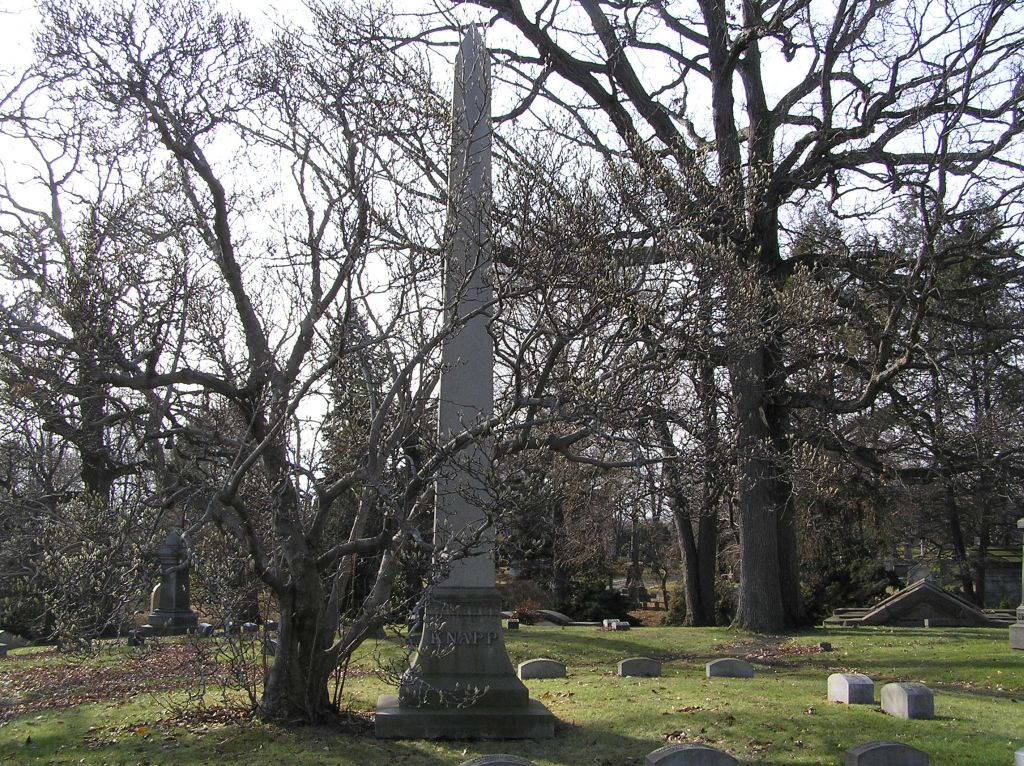
The gravesite of Herman Knapp

In 1869, with Salomon Moos (1831–1895), he founded the "Archives of Ophthalmology and Otology" (Archiv für Augen- und Ohrenheilkunde), an international scientific monthly journal that was published in Wiesbaden (in German) and New York (in English). In 1878 the archives split into two independent entities; as the "Archives of Ophthalmology" (Archiv für Augenheilkunde) and the "Journal of Otology" (Zeitschrift für Ohrenheilkunde).

His name is lent to the eponymous "Knapp streaks"; also known as angioid streaks, which are tiny breaks in the elastin-filled tissue in the back of the eye. He devised his own version of an ophthalmotrope, a device used in physiological optics to demonstrate the action of ocular muscles individually or in various combinations. Several instruments used in eye surgery bear his name, including the "Knapp trachoma forceps".

Knapp is interred in New York City at Woodlawn Cemetery.

== Selected writings ==
- "Curvature of the Cornea of the Human Eye" (German: Die Krümmung der Hornhaut des menschlichen Auges, Heidelberg, 1859)
- "Intraocular Tumors" (Karlsruhe, 1868), New York", 1869)
- "Cocaine and its Use in Ophthalmic and General Surgery" (New York, 1885)
- "Investigations on Fermentation, Putrefaction, and Suppuration" (1886)
- "Cataract Extraction without Iridectomy" (1887)
- "A Series of One Thousand Successive Cases of Cataract Extraction without Iridectomy" (1887).
