= Salomon Moos =

German otologist

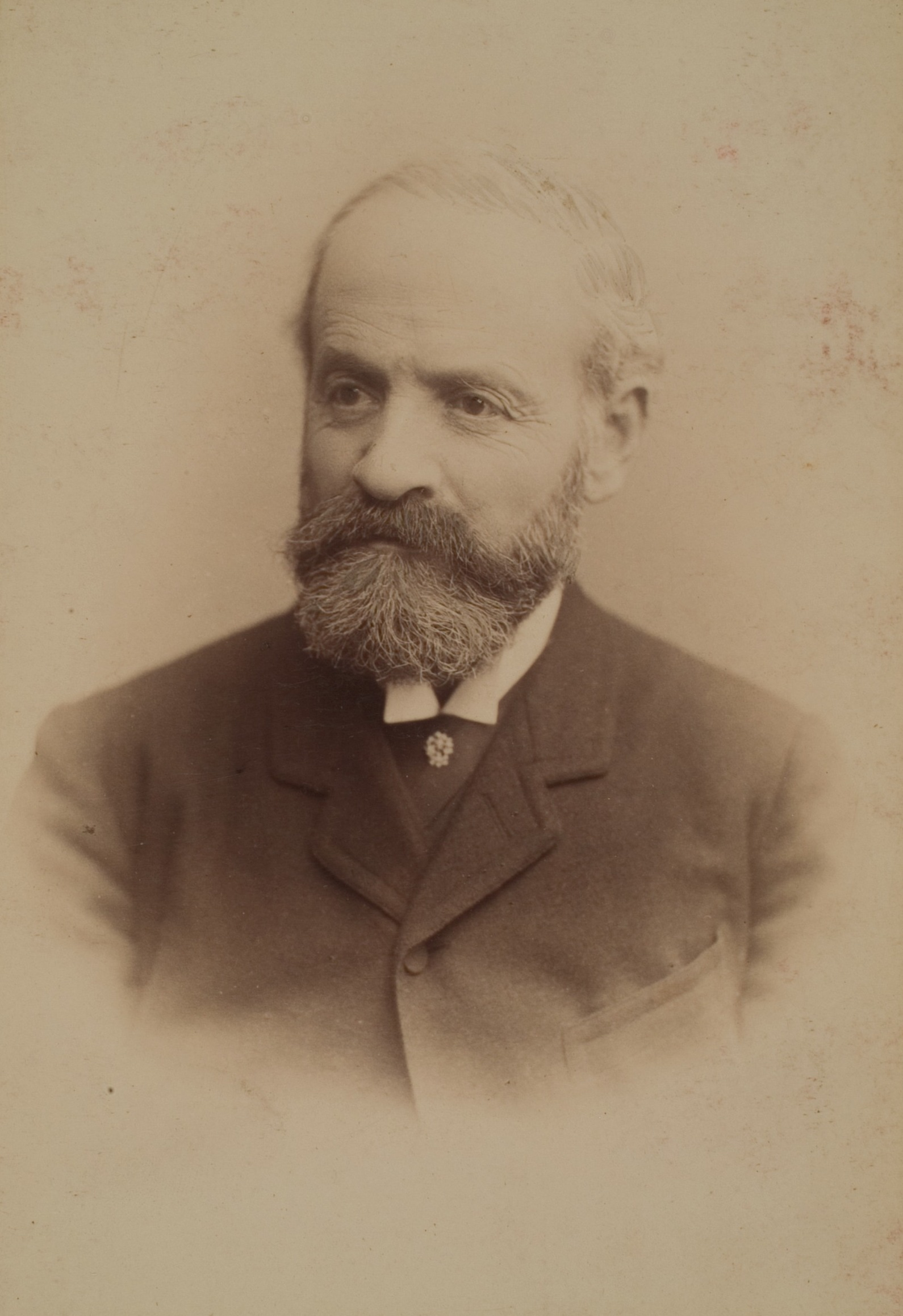
Salomon Moos

Salomon Moos (15 July 1831 – 15 July 1895) was a German otologist born in Randegg, a village in the Grand Duchy of Baden.

He studied medicine at the University of Heidelberg, and following graduation worked as an assistant at the medical clinic of Karl Ewald Hasse. Afterwards, he continued his education in Prague and Vienna, and in 1859 became privat-docent at Heidelberg. In 1866 he was an associate professor, later being appointed director and chief surgeon of the otology clinic at the University of Heidelberg.

His better known research involved diseases of the inner ears' labyrinth. Moos is credited with being the first physician to point out that in certain infectious diseases, micro-organisms within the labyrinth negatively affect hearing and equilibrium.

== Publications ==
In 1869 he co-founded the Archiv für Augen- und Ohrenheilkunde ("Archives of Ophthalmology and Otology") with Hermann Jakob Knapp, a journal that was published in German and English, with Moos being director of the otological department of the German edition. In 1878 the ophthalmological and otological departments separated into independent entities, with Moos being editor of the Zeitschrift für Ohrenheilkunde until his death in 1895.

Among his better known written works was a translation of Joseph Toynbee's "Diseases of the Ear" as Lehrbuch der Ohrenkrankheiten (1863). Other publications by Moos include:

- Klinik der Ohrenkrankheiten (Clinic for ear diseases), (1866)
- Anatomie und Physiologie der Eustachisehen Rohre (Anatomy and physiology of the Eustachian tubes), (1874)
- Uber Meningitis cerebrospinalis Epidemica, (1881)
- Uber Pilzinvasion des Labyrinths im Gofolge von Masern (Concerning fungal infection of the labyrinths in association with measles), (1888)
- Histologische und bakterielle Untersucliungen Uber Mittelohrerkrankungenbei den verschiedenen Fonnen Diphtherie, (1890)
