= Listing number =

Invariant of a topological space

In mathematics, a Listing number of a topological space is one of several topological invariants introduced by the 19th-century mathematician Johann Benedict Listing and later given this name by Charles Sanders Peirce. Unlike the later invariants given by Bernhard Riemann, the Listing numbers do not form a complete set of invariants: two different two-dimensional manifolds may have the same Listing numbers as each other.

There are four Listing numbers associated with a space. The smallest Listing number counts the number of connected components of a space, and is thus equivalent to the zeroth Betti number.
