= Listing's law =

Geometric description of eye positioning and movement

Listing's law, named after German mathematician Johann Benedict Listing (1808–1882), describes the three-dimensional orientation of the eye and its axes of rotation. Listing's law has been shown to hold when the head is stationary and upright and gaze is directed toward far targets, i.e., when the eyes are either fixating, making saccades, or pursuing moving visual targets.

Listing's law (often abbreviated L1) has been generalized to the binocular extension of Listing's law (often abbreviated L2) which also covers vergence.

Listing proposed Listing's law based on its geometric beauty, although he never published it. It was first published by Christian Georg Theodor Ruete in a 1855 textbook. Hermann von Helmholtz first found empirical justification based on measurements of afterimages.

Listing's law has also been reported for the head, the arm, and the wrist, although for the head, the control is more nuanced.

== Definition ==
Listing's law states that the eye does not achieve all possible 3D orientations and that, instead, all achieved eye orientations can be reached by starting from one specific "primary" reference orientation and then rotating about an axis that lies within the plane orthogonal to the primary orientation's gaze direction (line of sight / visual axis). This plane is called Listing's plane.

Stated in another way, the rotation vector that would turn the eye from the primary orientation to any orientation lies in a plane perpendicular to the primary orientation.

The expression of Listing's law can be simplified by creating a coordinate system where the origin is primary position, the vertical and horizontal axes of rotation are aligned in Listing's plane, and the third (torsional) axis is orthogonal to Listing's plane. In this coordinate system, Listing's law simply states that the torsional component of eye orientation is held at zero. (Note that this is not the same description of ocular torsion as rotation around the line of sight: whereas movements that start or end at the primary position can indeed be performed without any rotation about the line of sight, this is not the case for arbitrary movements.) Listing's law can also be formulated in a coordinate-free form using geometric algebra.

=== Donders' law ===
Listing's law is a specific realization of a more generic Donders' law, which states that for any one gaze direction, the eye's 3D spatial orientation is unique and independent of how the eye reached that gaze direction (previous gaze directions, eye orientations, temporal movements). It was proposed by Franciscus Donders in 1875. The effect is that even though the space of all possible eye orientations is 3D (since it is the SO(3) group), the actually realized eye orientations is just a 2D slice of it.

The head also satisfies Donders' law, in that if the head is facing a certain direction, then the head's 3D spatial orientation is unique and independent of how the head reached that facing direction. Two theories for how the head moves have been proposed: the Fick system and the Helmholtz system.

The Fick system states that the head rotates as if it is mounted on a gimbal with a fixed vertical axis and a rotating horizontal axis, while the Helmholtz system is the reverse.

The difference between the three systems can be described mathematically. Set up a coordinate system such that when the eye gazes straight ahead, it is gazing in the $+x$ direction, the up direction the $+z$ direction, and the left direction the $+y$ direction. Now, Listing's law states that the velocity plane for the straight-ahead gaze direction has equation $x = 0$. Using small-angle approximation, the Fick system implies that near the origin, the velocity surface is $x = -yz$, and the Helmholtz system implies that it is $x = +yz$. Thus, both the Fick and the Helmholtz system imply a velocity surface with the shape of a hyperbolic paraboloid, but twisting in opposite directions. The equation of the velocity surface is more complicated far from the origin.

It has been shown that the control of the head is more nuanced. Under normal situations, a human subject moves its head according to the Fick system, but when wearing pinhole glasses, a human subject moves its head closer to Listing's law. When it is required to point a helmet-mounted laser toward targets, it moves its head even closer to Listing's law.

=== Listing's plane ===
The Listing's plane of a subject can be measured by recording the vector of rotation that would cause the eye to rotate from its primary position to a rotated position. It is orthogonal to the line of sight at the primary position. The line of sight is typically horizontal, but does not necessarily point straight ahead (perpendicular to the coronal plane). Instead, it points towards the nose or the temples by as much as 15 degrees, across subjects. Also, within each subject, the primary position tilts towards the temples when viewing distant objects due to vergence. The tilt angle is 0.72° per degree of vergence

The plane has thickness (standard deviation) of about 1 degree.

=== Listing's half-angle rule ===
Let $\hat n$ be the gaze direction when the eye is in the primary position.

Consider the scenario: The eye is looking at a certain direction $\hat v$, then it turns towards a different direction $\hat v'$. If the eye follows Listing's law, then orientation of the eye is uniquely determined in both gaze directions, and so there exists a unique rotation that turns the eye from the first orientation to the second.

It is a theorem of geometry that, for any $\hat v, \hat v'$, the rotation axis is in the plane perpendicular to $\frac{\hat n + \hat v}{2}$. This is Listing's half-angle rule. This can be proved by noting that a rotation by $\theta$ is composed of two reflections across two planes $\theta/2$ apart. The plane is called the velocity plane (or displacement plane). In particular, Listing's plane is the velocity plane of the primary position.

Indeed, Listing's law can be deduced as a converse to Listing's half-angle rule and Donders' law. Specifically, because of Donders' law, for any two gaze directions $\hat v, \hat v'$, there exists a unique rotation vector $\vec\omega(\hat v, \hat v')$ that rotates the eye from the orientation at $\hat v$ to the orientation at $\hat v'$. Now, if there exists some $\hat v$, such that the set $\{\vec\omega(\hat v, \hat v')\}_{\hat v'}$ lies in some plane, then there exists some primary direction $\hat v_0$ for which Listing's law holds.

== Purpose ==
There has been considerable debate for over a century whether the purpose of Listing's law is primarily motor or perceptual. Some modern neuroscientists – who have tended to emphasize optimization of multiple variables – consider Listing's law to be the best compromise between motor factors (e.g., taking the shortest possible rotation path) and visual factors (see below for details).

== Common misconceptions ==
1. It is often assumed that the primary position is at the mechanical center of the eye's range of movement. Primary position can only be determined by measuring Listing's plane. Direct measurements show that the location of primary position (and thus the orientation of Listing's plane) varies between subjects. Primary position is generally close to center, but it may be rotated slightly up or down, left or right.
2. It is often misunderstood that Listing's law says that the eye only rotates about axes in Listing's plane. This is incorrect. Listing's plane only provides the orientations of the eye relative to primary position, expressed as an angle of rotation about some axis in Listing's plane (normally using the right-hand rule, where one curls the fingers of the right hand in the direction of rotation and the thumb then points in the direction of the rotation vector). This is not the same as the axes that the eye actually rotates about; in fact, Listing's law requires that the rotation axis of most saccades lies outside of Listing's plane, more specifically, the rotation axis lies in Listing's plane only if the movement starts or ends at the primary position or if it is a prolongation of such a movement.

The axes of rotation associated with Listing's law are only in Listing's plane for movements that head toward or away from primary position. For all other eye movements towards or away from some non-primary position, the eye must rotate by the half-angle rule.

== Modifications and violations ==
Yaw, pitch, roll.

=== Half-Listing's law strategy ===
Listing's law is violated when the eyes counter-rotate during head rotation to maintain gaze stability, either due to the vestibulo-ocular reflex (VOR) or the optokinetic reflex. Here the eye simply rotates about approximately the same axis as the head (which could even be a pure torsional rotation). This generally results in slow movements that drive the eye torsionally out of Listing's plane. However, when the head translates without rotating, gaze direction remains stable but Listing's law is still maintained. Specifically, if the head rolls (shaking left and right), the counterroll reflex would roll the eyes in the opposite direction, violating Listing's law.

Listing's law persists if a torsional bias is added, when the head is held at a tilted posture and the eyes counter-roll, and when the head is held steady upward or downward Listing's plane tilts slightly in the opposite direction.

Perfect VOR would stabilize retinal image but cause violation to Listing's law, As a compromise, eye motion follows the half-Listing's law strategy, where instead of following the Listing's half-angle rule (a geometric consequence of Listing's rule), eyes react to head motion in VOR by rotating around a modified velocity plane. The modified velocity plane makes an angle with Listing's plane that is 1/4, instead of 1/2, of the angle between the gaze direction and the primary direction.

=== Other violations ===
When larger "gaze saccades" are accompanied by a head movement, Listing's law cannot be maintained constantly because the eyes move much faster than the head. The eye typically reaches the destination in 80 ms, but the head needs about 300 ms. In this case, the eyes start at the position following Listing's law, then arrive at the destination violating it, then as the head continues to move into position, the eyes retain their orientation, until the head reaches the destination, and the eyes end up following Listing's law again in the end. The temporary violation can reach up to 15 degrees of torsion relative to Listing's law. The data can be explained by assuming that the eyes take the fastest possible path to their final orientation, with no constraints on torsion, except that it stays less than 15 degrees.

Listing's law does not hold during sleep.

Listing's law holds during fixation, saccades, and smooth pursuit. Furthermore, Listing's law has been generalized to the binocular extension of Listing's law, which holds also during vergence.

=== Adaptation ===
Listing's law can be violated in neurological conditions, such as acute unilateral fourth nerve palsy. However, there is an adaptive mechanism that ensures Listing's law, so that chronic patients of unilateral fourth nerve palsy satisfy Listing's law again. The adaptation fails under central fascicular palsy, as even chronic patients suffer from deviation from Listing's law.

=== Binocular extension ===
While Listing's law holds only for eyes that fixate a distant point (at optical infinity), it has been extended to include also vergence. From this binocular extension of Listing's law, it follows that vergence can lead to a change of cyclotorsion. The Listing's planes of the two eyes tilt outward, opposite to the eyes, when they converge on a near target. During convergence, there is a relative excyclotorsion on upgaze and a relative incyclotorsion on downgaze.

=== Shape and thickness ===
Certain slight physiological deviations from Listing's rule are commonly described in terms of the "shape" and "thickness" of Listing's plane:

- the "shape" specifies in how far it is indeed a (flat) plane or more generally a somewhat curved surface,
- the "thickness" specifies in how far eye movements indeed lie precisely within the plane (or surface) or may lie just slightly next to it.

== Visual consequences ==
Since Listing's law and its variants determine the orientation of the eye(s) for any particular gaze direction, it therefore determines the spatial pattern of visual stimulation on the retina(s). For example, since Listing's law defines torsion as zero about a head-fixed axis, this results in "false torsional" tilts about the line of sight when the eye is at tertiary (oblique) positions, which the brain must compensate for when interpreting the visual image. Torsion is not good for binocular vision because it complicates the already difficult problem of matching images from the two eyes for stereopsis (depth vision). The binocular version of Listing's law is thought to be a best compromise to simplify this problem, although it does not completely rid the visual system of the need to know current eye orientation.

== Physiology ==
In the 1990s there was considerable debate about whether Listing's law is a neural or mechanical phenomenon. However, the accumulated evidence suggests that both factors play a role in the implementation of different aspects of Listing's law.

The horizontal recti muscles of the eyes only contribute to horizontal eye rotation and position, but the vertical recti and oblique muscles each have approximately equal vertical and torsional actions (in Listing's plane coordinates). Thus, to hold eye position in Listing's plane, there needs to be a balance of activation between these muscles so that torsion cancels to zero.

The eye muscles may also contribute to Listing's law by having position-dependent pulling directions during motion, i.e., this might be the mechanism that implements the "half-angle rule" described above.

Higher gaze control centers in the frontal cortex and superior colliculus are only concerned with pointing gaze in the right direction and do not appear to be involved in 3D eye control or the implementation of Listing's law. However, the brainstem reticular formation centers that control vertical eye position (the interstitial nucleus of Cajal; INC) and saccade velocity (the rostral interstitial nucleus of the medial longitudinal fasciculus; riMLF) are equally involved in torsional control, each being divided into populations of neurons that control directions similar to those of the vertical and torsional pulling eye muscles. However, these neural coordinate systems appear to align with Listing's plane in a way that probably simplifies Listing's law: positive and negative torsional control is balanced across the midline of the brainstem so that equal activation produces positions and movements in Listing's plane. Thus torsional control is only needed for movements toward or away from Listing's plane. However, it remains unclear how 2D activity in the higher gaze centres results in the right pattern of 3D activity in the brainstem. The brainstem premotor centers (INC, riMLF, etc.) project to the motoneurons for eye muscles, which encode positions and displacements of the eyes while leaving the "half-angle rule" to the mechanics of the eyes itself (see above). The cerebellum also plays a role in correcting deviations from Listing's plane.

== Pathology ==
Damage to any of the physiology described above can disrupt Listing's law and thus have negative impacts for vision. Disorders of the eye muscles (such as strabismus) often cause torsional offsets in eye position that are particularly troublesome when they differ between the two eyes, as the resulting cyclodisparity may lead to cyclodisplopia (double vision due to relative torsion) and may prevent binocular fusion. Damage to the vestibular system and brainstem reticular formation centres for 3D eye control can cause torsional offsets and/or torsional drifting motion of the eyes that severely disrupts vision. Degeneration of the cerebellum causes torsional control to become "sloppy". Similar effects occur during alcohol consumption.

The influence of strabismus surgery on the Listing's planes of the two eyes is not fully understood. In one study, patients' eyes showed greater adherence to Listing's rule after the operation, however, the relative orientation of the Listing's planes of the two eyes had changed.

== Measurement ==
The orientation of Listing's plane (equivalently, the location of the primary position) of an individual can be measured using scleral coils. It can also be measured using a synoptometer.

Alternatively, it can be measured using eye tracking (see also Eye tracking on the ISS for an example).

== Discovery and history ==
Listing's law was named after German mathematician Johann Benedict Listing (1808–1882). It is not clear how Listing derived this idea, but apparently based on his geometric aesthetics.

Listing's law was first confirmed experimentally by the 19th-century polymath Hermann von Helmholtz, who compared visual afterimages at various eye positions to predictions derived from Listing's law and found that they matched. Helmholtz argued that Listing's law can be explained as the way to minimize changes in orientation of objects on the retina for all possible gaze directions.

Listing's law was first measured directly, with the use of 3D eye coils in the 1980s by Ferman, Collewijn and colleagues. In the late 1980s Tweed and Vilis were the first to directly measure and visualize Listing's plane, and also contributed to the understanding of the laws of rotational kinematics that underlie Listing's law. Since then many investigators have used similar technology to test various aspects of Listing's law. Demer and Miller have championed the role of eye muscles, whereas Crawford and colleagues worked out several of the neural mechanisms described above over the past two decades.
