= Reduced eye =

The reduced eye is an idealized model of the optics of the human eye. Introduced by Franciscus Donders, the reduced eye model replaces the several refracting bodies of the eye (the cornea, lens, aqueous humor, and vitreous humor) are replaced by an ideal air/water interface surface that is located 20 mm from a model retina. This, converts a system with six cardinal points (two focal points, two principal points and two nodal points) into one with three cardinal points (two focal points and one nodal point).

The reduced eye model is used by medical students when studying refractive errors such as myopia and hyperopia (near- and far-sightedness) and by ophthalmologists to simplify corrective lens computations.
