= Hünfelden =

- Municipality
- Flag Coat of arms

- Location of Hünfelden within Limburg-Weilburg district
- Interactive map of Hünfelden
- Location within Germany Location within Hesse
- Coordinates: 50°20′N 8°9′E
- Country: Germany
- State: Hesse
- Admin. region: Gießen
- District: Limburg-Weilburg

Government
  - Mayor (2022–28): Silvia Scheu-Menzer (Ind.)

Area
  - Total: 62.7 km^{2} (24.2 sq mi)
- Elevation: 222 m (728 ft)

Population (2025-12-31)
  - Total: 9,744
  - Density: 155/km^{2} (403/sq mi)
- Time zone: UTC+01:00 (CET)
  - Summer (DST): UTC+02:00 (CEST)
- Postal codes: 65597
- Dialling codes: 06438, 06431 (Mensfelden)
- Vehicle registration: LM, WEL
- Website: www.huenfelden.de

Hünfelden is a municipality in Limburg-Weilburg district in Hesse, Germany. Hünfelden lies on the Hühnerstraße, an historic part of Bundesstraße 417.

== Geography ==
=== Location ===
Hünfelden lies in the Taunus north of Wiesbaden, 9 km southeast of Limburg an der Lahn.

=== Neighbouring communities ===
Hünfelden borders in the north on the town of Limburg and the community of Brechen, in the east on the community of Selters and the town of Bad Camberg (all in Limburg-Weilburg), in the south on the communities of Hünstetten and Aarbergen (both in Rheingau-Taunus-Kreis), and in the west on the Verbandsgemeinden (a kind of collective municipality) of Aar-Einrich and Diez (both in Rhein-Lahn-Kreis in Rhineland-Palatinate).

=== Constituent communities ===
The community consists of seven Ortsteile, each formerly autonomous, listed here with population figures as of 15 May 2022.

- Kirberg: 2,310
- Dauborn: 2,530
- Mensfelden: 1,250
- Heringen: 970
- Nauheim: 870
- Ohren: 790
- Neesbach: 740

== History ==
The community of Hünfelden came into being within the framework of administrative reform in Hesse on 1 October 1971 through the voluntary merger of the then autonomous communities of Dauborn, Heringen, Kirberg, Mensfelden, Nauheim, Neesbach and Ohren. The name “Hünfelden” was chosen then because of the great number of cromlechs – Hünengräber in German – from Hallstatt times around the centres of Heringen and Ohren. At the time of founding, the community’s population was 6,952.

Among Hünfelden’s constituent communities, Mensfelden can claim the earliest documentary mention, which came in 775. Dauborn, Heringen and the now long-vanished village of Bubenheim, which lay in the area of today’s Kirberg, followed in 790 in the Prüm Abbey’s golden book. Through Hünfelden’s current municipal area ran the Via Publica as well as the Hühnerstraße (roads). In 1355, a castle was built in Kirberg.

In 1235, the Cistercian convent of Gnadenthal was founded, which in 1590 was furnished with a great Abbess’s house. After the Reformation, the site became Nassau stately domain. Since 1969, the Christian community “Jesusbruderschaft” (“Jesus Brotherhood”) has existed there.

== Politics ==
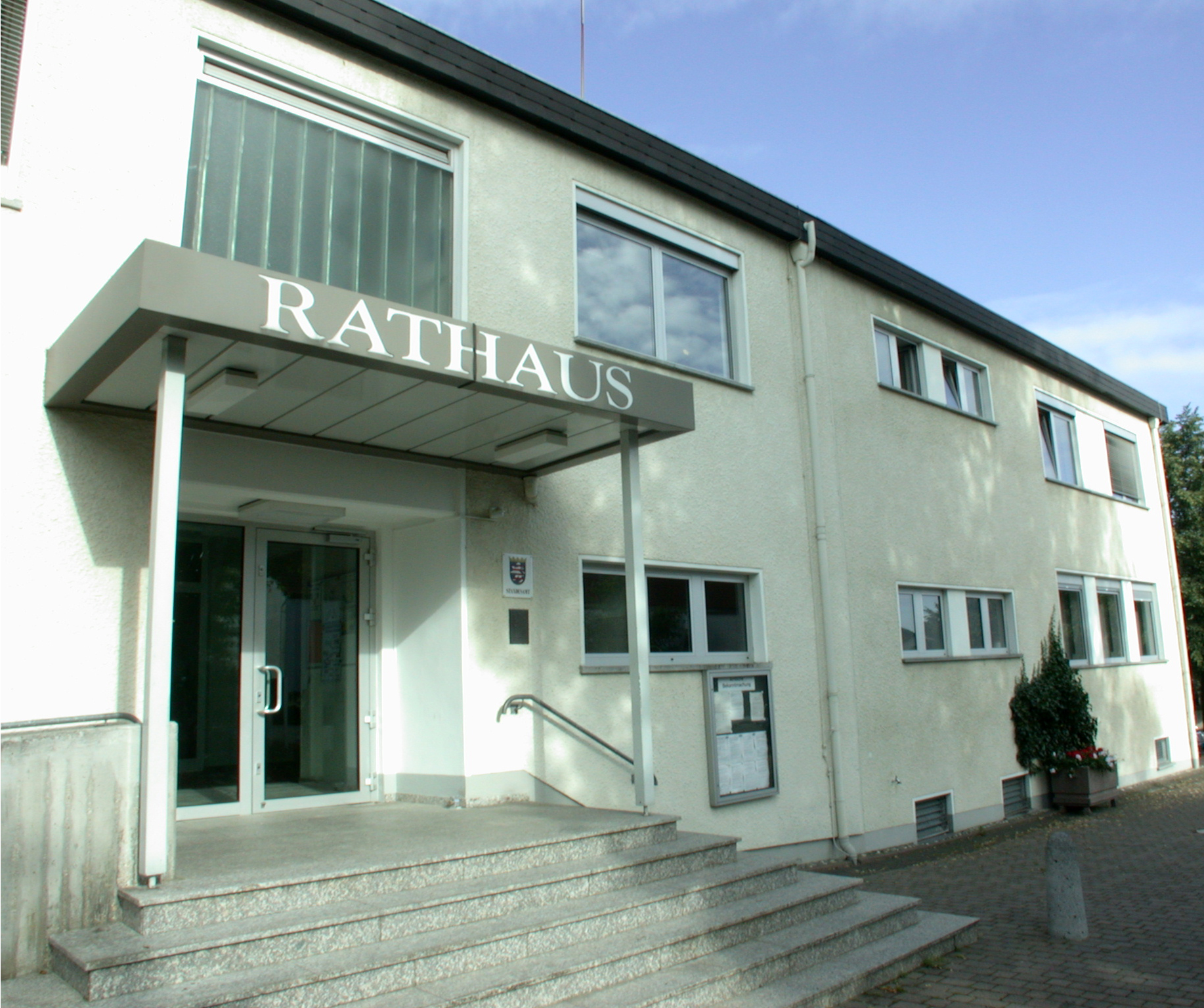
Hünfelden Town Hall in Kirberg

=== Community council ===
The municipal election held on 26 March 2006 yielded the following results:

Parties and voter communities		% 2006	seats 2006	% 2001	seats 2001
CDU	Christian Democratic Union of Germany	40.5	15	35.9	13
SPD	Social Democratic Party of Germany	40.8	15	39.5	15
FDP	Free Democratic Party	2.5	1	1.6	1
FBH	Freie Bürgerliste Hünfelden	16.1	6	19.9	7
GRÜNE	Bündnis 90/Die Grünen	–	–	3.1	1
Total		100.0	37	100.0	37
voter turnout in %		45.6		51.4	

== Culture and sightseeing ==
=== Buildings ===
- Kirberg castle ruins
- Restored timber-frame buildings and former town hall in Kirberg
- Stein’sches Haus in Kirberg
- Former Gnadenthal convent
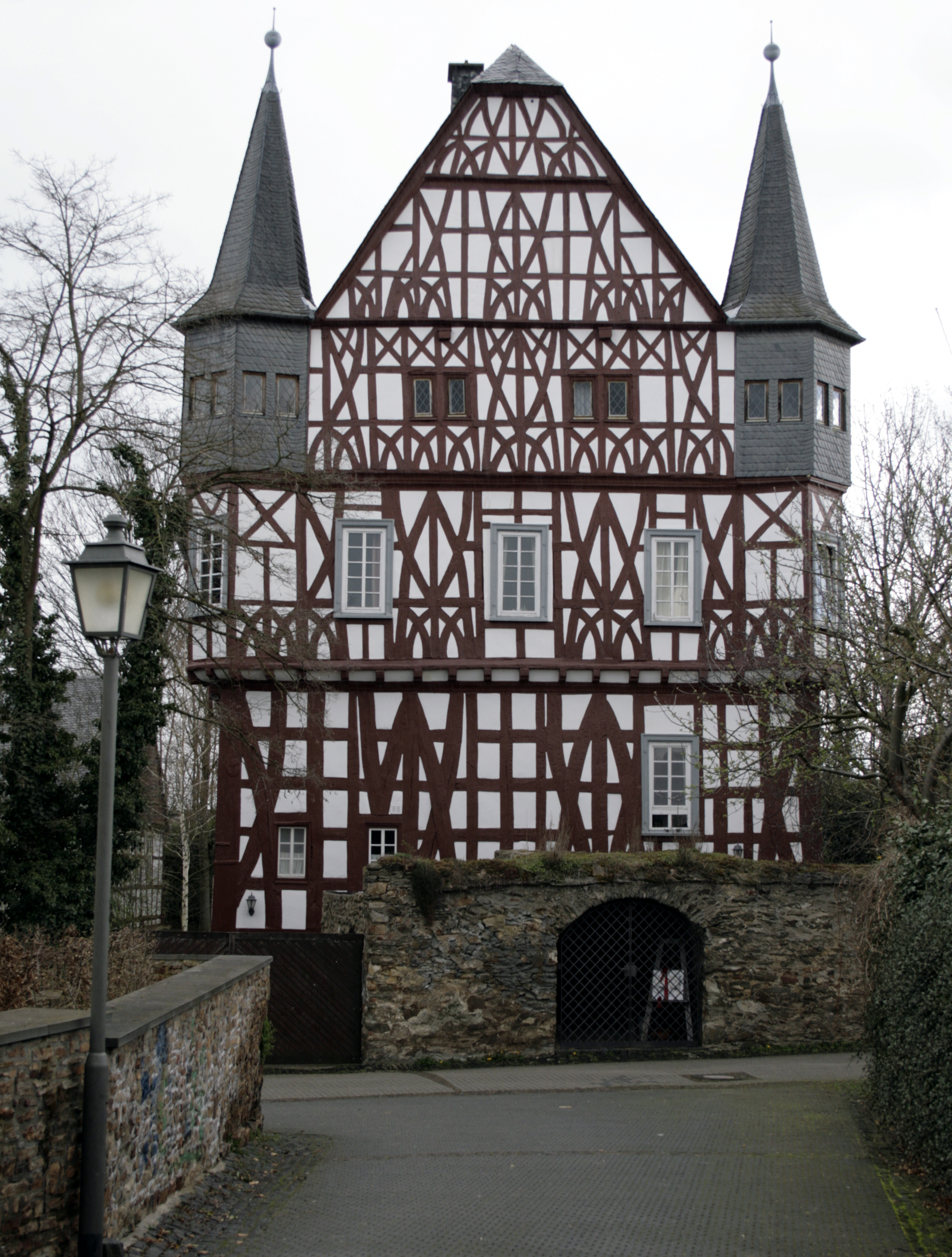
Stein’sches Haus in Kirberg

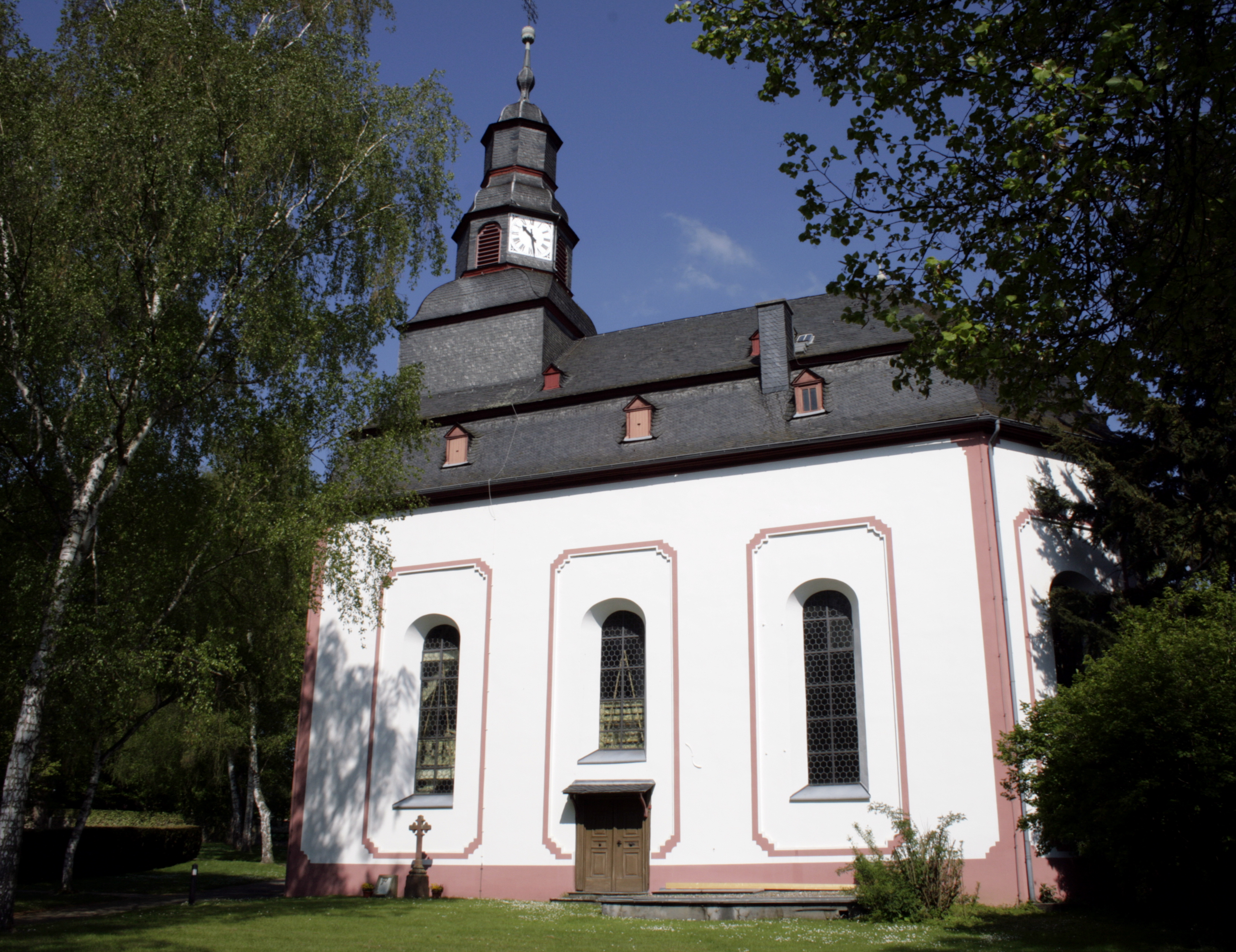
Dauborn church

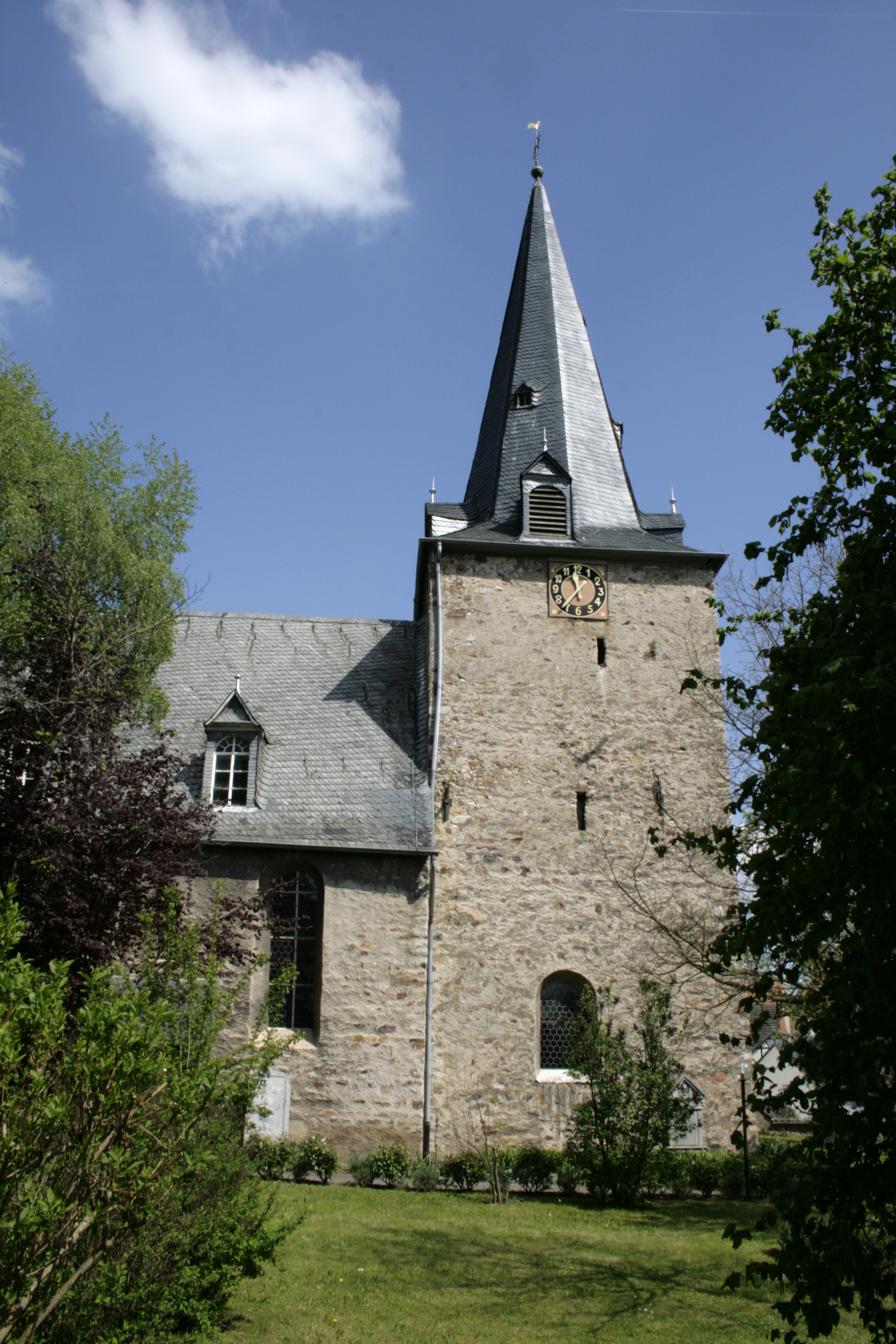
Mensfelden churchtower

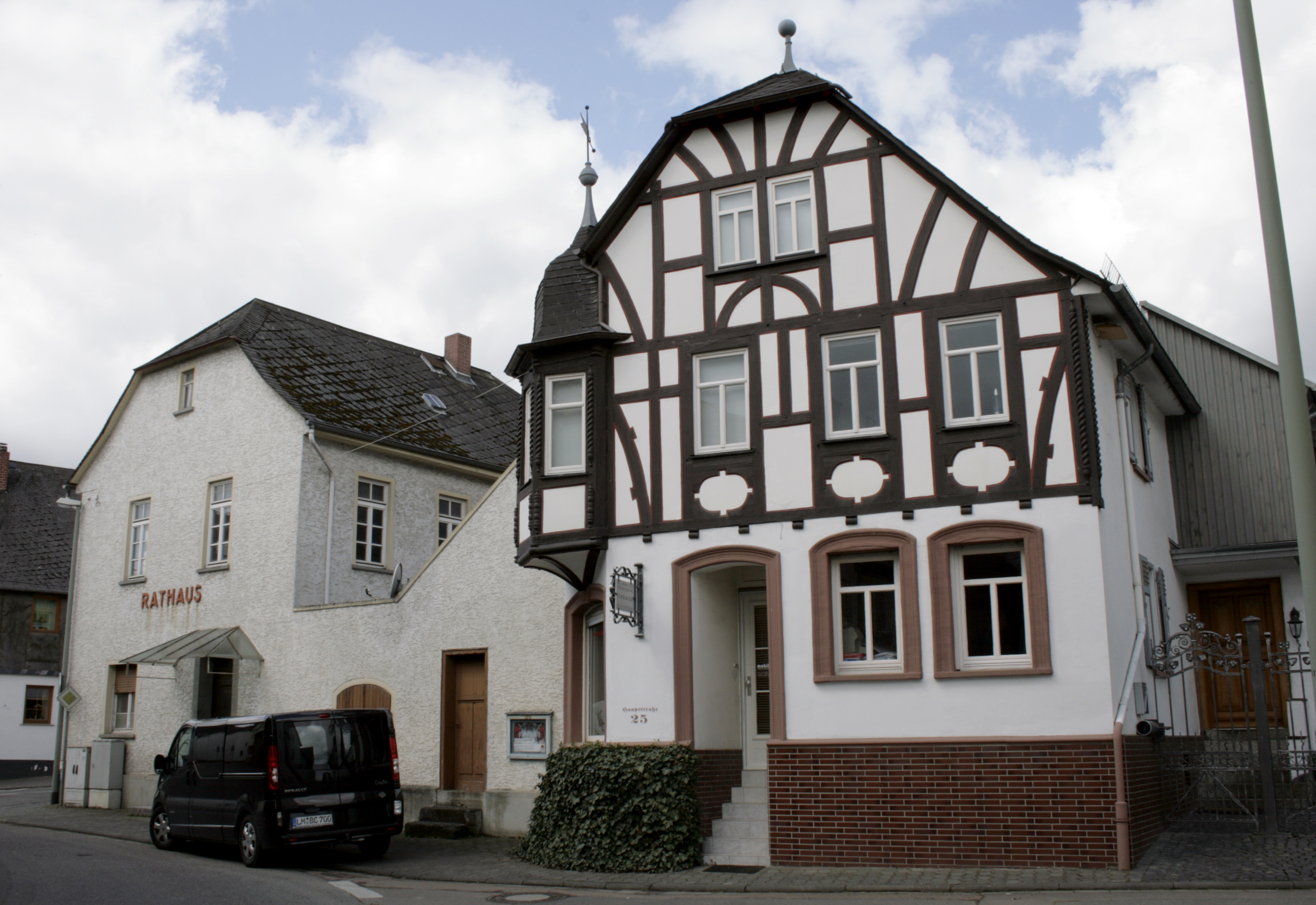
Former town hall and former postal station in Heringen

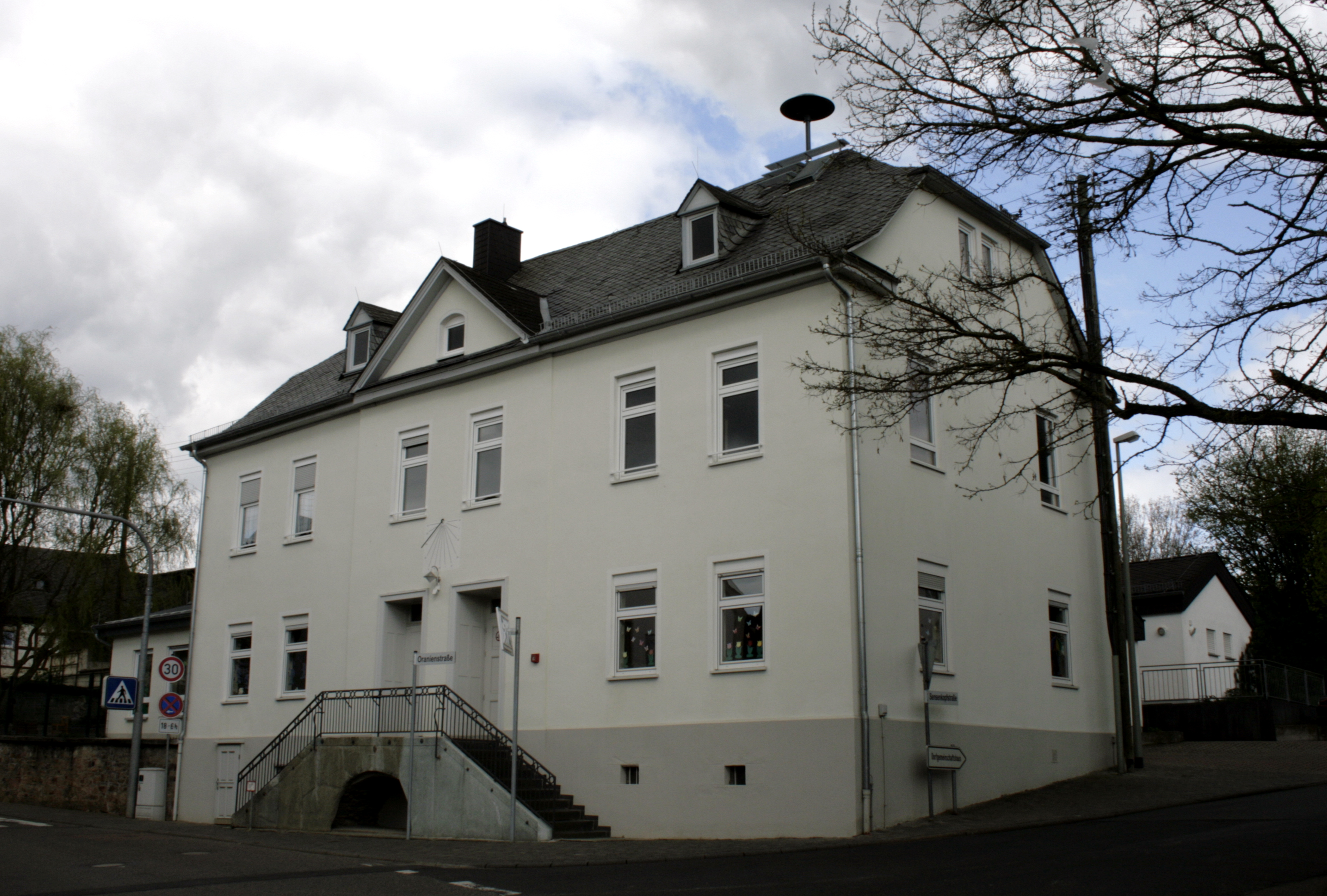
Old school in Nauheim

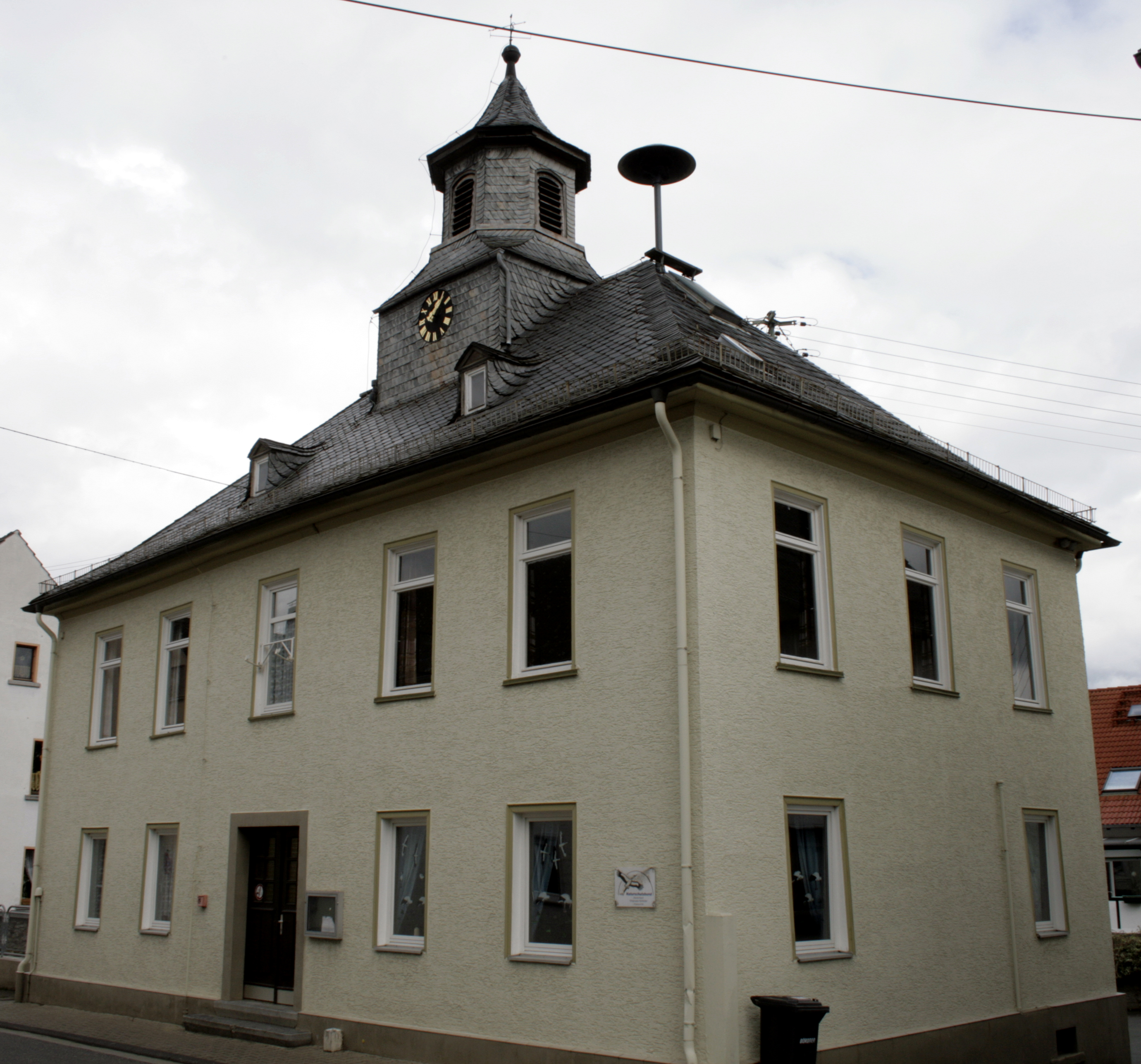
Old school in Ohren

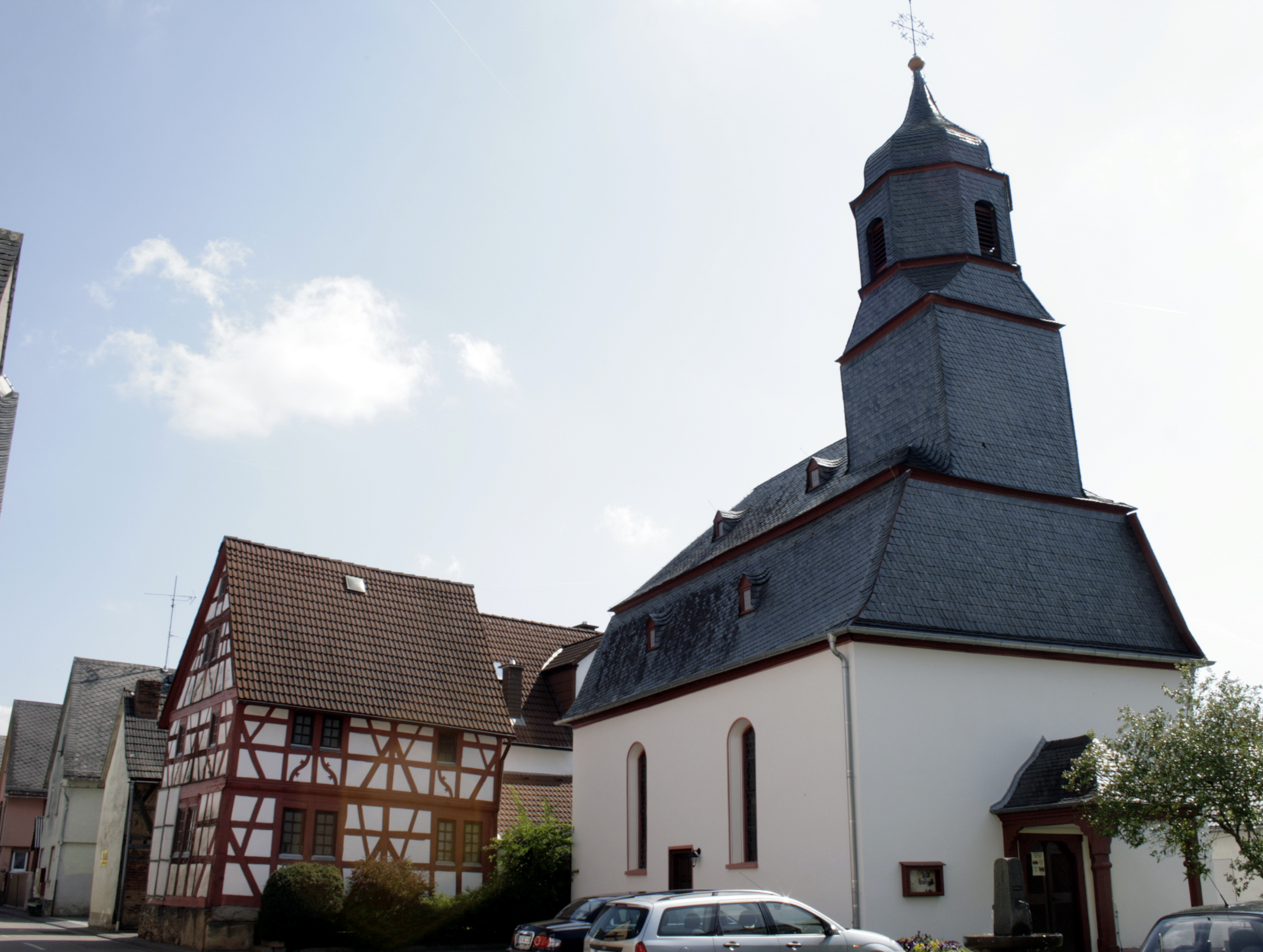
Neesbach church

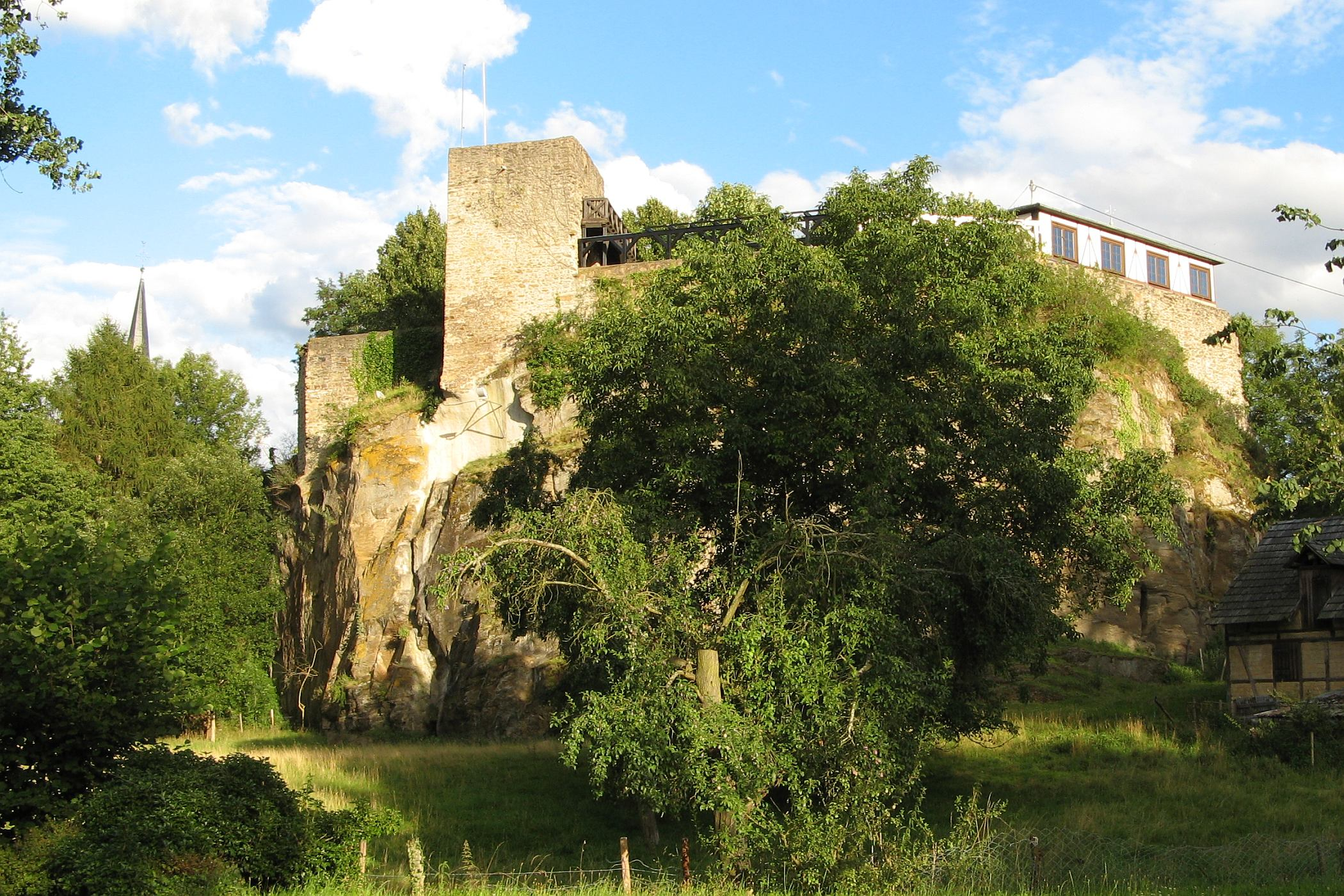
Kirberg castle ruins

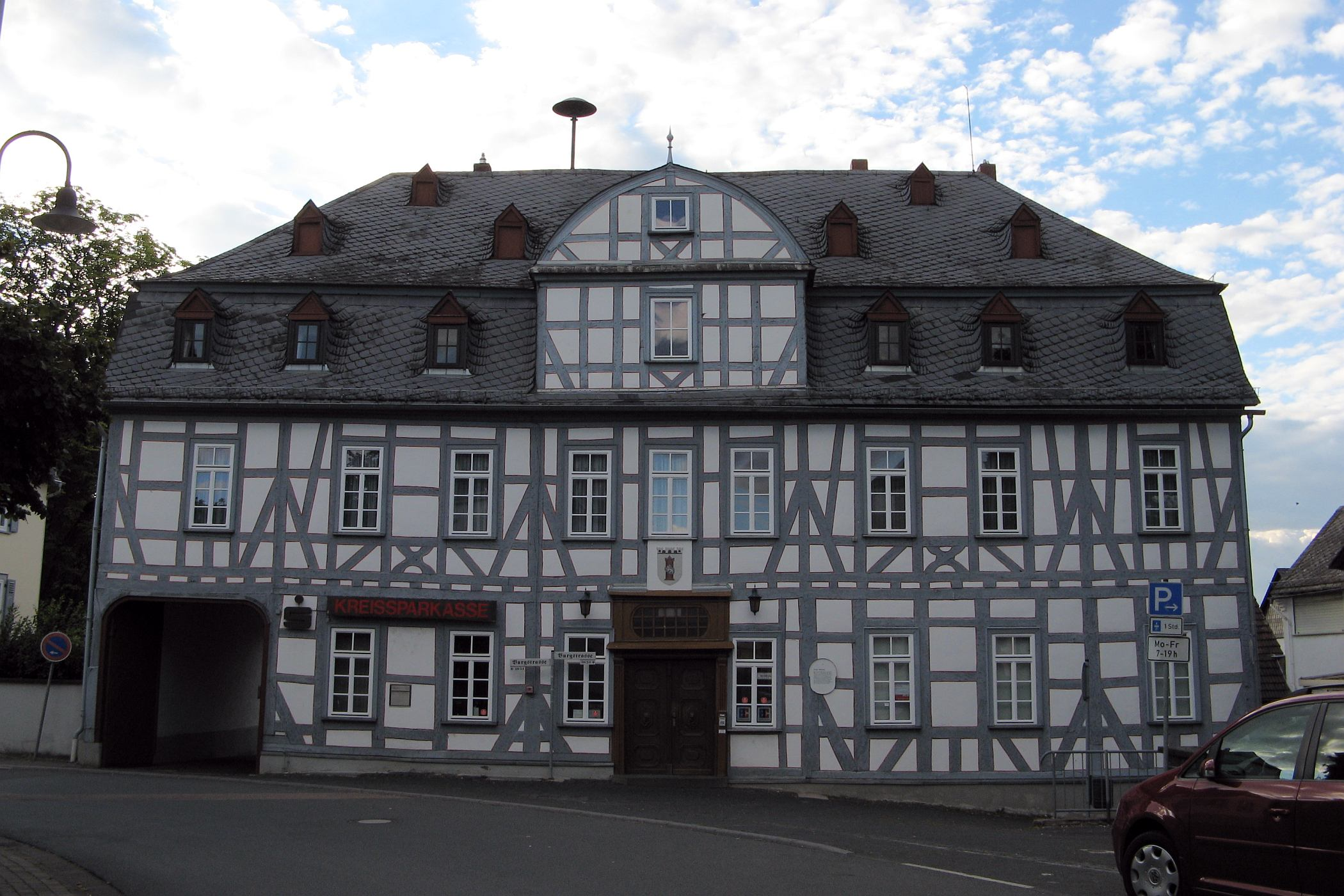
Former town hall of Kirberg

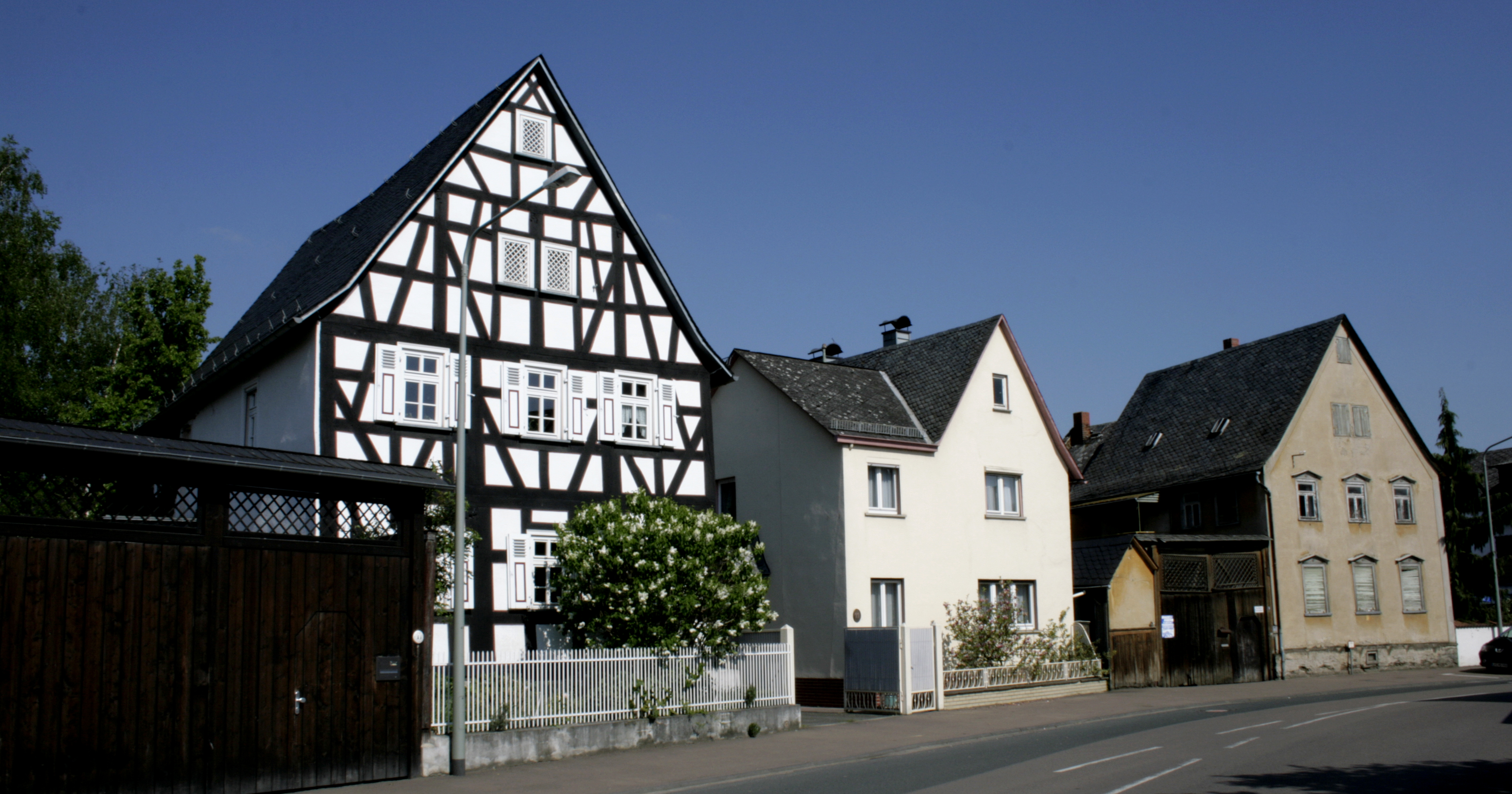
Row of buildings in Dauborn

=== Museums ===
- Heimatmuseum (local lore) in Kirberg.

== Economy and infrastructure ==
=== Transport ===
Hünfelden has developed itself into a residential community, as it has transport connections with Wiesbaden and Limburg an der Lahn (Bundesstraße 417) as well as with the Frankfurt Rhein-Main Region over A 3 (Cologne–Frankfurt) through the Limburg-Süd and Bad Camberg interchanges. At the same time it has kept a quiet and rural character.

=== Education ===
The Freiherr-vom-Stein-Schule is a primary school, Hauptschule and Realschule with a Gymnasium branch.

=== Public institutions ===
- Kindergarten Kirberg
- Kindergarten Dauborn
- Kindergarten Heringen
- Kindergarten Mensfelden
- Kindergarten Nauheim
- Kindergarten Neesbach
- Kindergarten Ohren
- Kirberg Volunteer Fire Brigade, founded 1905 (includes Youth Fire Brigade)
- Dauborn Volunteer Fire Brigade, founded 1906 (includes Youth Fire Brigade)
- Heringen Volunteer Fire Brigade, founded 1909 (includes Youth Fire Brigade)
- Mensfelden Volunteer Fire Brigade, founded 1935 (includes Youth Fire Brigade)
- Nauheim Volunteer Fire Brigade, founded 1934 (includes Youth Fire Brigade)
- Neesbach Volunteer Fire Brigade, founded 1934 (includes Youth Fire Brigade)
- Ohren Volunteer Fire Brigade, founded 1934 (includes Youth Fire Brigade)

== Famous people ==
- Wilhelm Bender, Chairman of the board of Fraport AG
- Frank Gerhardt, composer (b. 1967)
- Andreas Felger, painter (b. 1935)
- Hildegard Pfaff, (b. 1952), Hessian politician (SPD)
- Karlheinz Weimar (b. 1950), since 1999 Hessian Finance Minister
