= Johann Benedict Listing =

German mathematician (1808–1882)

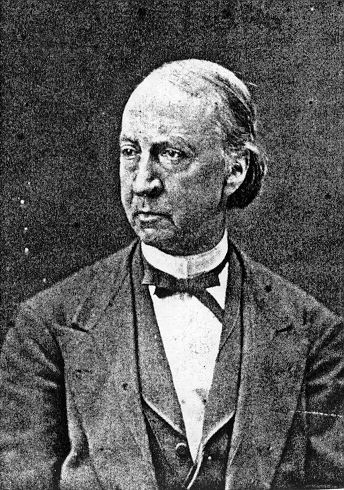
- Listing, c. 1860
- Born: 25 July 1808; Frankfurt, Principality of Frankfurt
- Died: 24 December 1882 (aged 74); Göttingen, Kingdom of Prussia
- Education: University of Göttingen
- Known for: Back-and-forth method Listing number Listing's knot Listing's law
- Scientific career
- Fields: Mathematics
- Doctoral advisor: Carl Friedrich Gauss
- Doctoral students: Edward Leamington Nichols

Johann Benedict Listing (25 July 1808 – 24 December 1882) was a German mathematician and physicist. He is remembered as a pioneer of topology, which also takes its name from his work.

== Early life and education ==
J. B. Listing was born in Frankfurt and died in Göttingen. He studied mathematics and architecture at the University of Göttingen, but his interests extended more broadly to topics such as terrestrial magnetism and physiological optics. In 1834 he received his doctorate under Carl Friedrich Gauss. He then spent three years traveling with Wolfgang Sartorius von Waltershausen to study the volcanic activity of Mount Etna in Sicily.

== Career ==
In 1837 Listing became a teacher of machine drawing, machine theory, and applied mathematics at the Höhere Gewerbeschule in Hanover. Two years later, in 1839, he was appointed professor of physics as the successor to Wilhelm Eduard Weber, and in 1849 he became professor of mathematics in Göttingen. Together with his friend, the ophthalmologist Christian Georg Theodor Ruete, he researched the laws of eye movement.

Encouraged by his mentor, Gauss, Listing began to specialize in topology, then known as analysis situs. In 1847 he published Vorstudien zur Topologie (Preliminary Studies in Topology), although he had already used the term “topology” in letters a decade earlier. This book helped introduce the term into general use. Independently of August Ferdinand Möbius, Listing also discovered the special properties of the Möbius strip in 1858 and went further in exploring the properties of strips with higher-order twists (paradromic rings). He discovered topological invariants which came to be called Listing numbers.

In ophthalmology, Listing's law describes an essential element of extraocular eye muscle coordination.

In geodesy, he coined in 1872 the term "geoid" for the idealized geometric surface of the figure of the Earth, as previously conceptualized by his doctoral adviser, Gauss.

Listing was elected a member of the Göttingen Academy of Sciences in 1861 and became an Honorary Fellow of the Royal Society of Edinburgh in 1879.

== Personal life ==
Listing's granddaughter was British War Artist Anna Airy, by his younger daughter Anna.
