= Christian Georg Theodor Ruete =

German ophthalmologist (1810–1867)

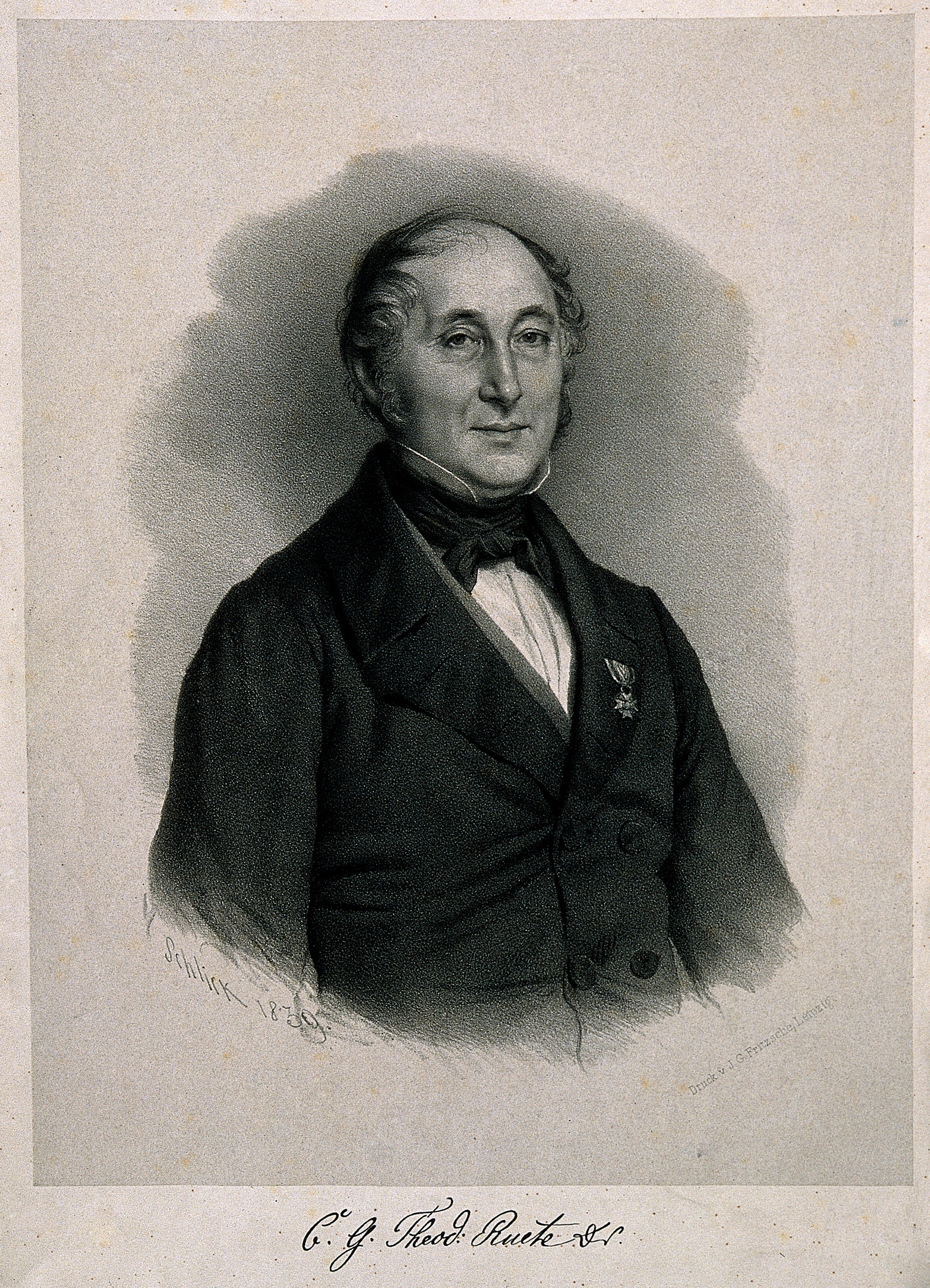
Christian Georg Theodor Ruete

Christian Georg Theodor Ruete (2 May 1810 – 23 June 1867) was a German ophthalmologist born in Scharmbeck, Lower Saxony.

In 1833 obtained his medical doctorate from the University of Göttingen, later serving as an assistant to Karl Gustav Himly (1772–1837). In 1841 he became an associate professor at Göttingen, receiving the title of "full professor" in 1847. Afterwards he was a professor of ophthalmology at the University of Leipzig from 1852 to 1867.

Christian Ruete was a pioneer of German ophthalmology, and made several significant contributions in this field. In 1845 he designed the first ophthalmotrope, a device that serves as a mechanical model of the eye and its muscles, and is used to clarify movements of the eye. In 1857 he constructed an improved version of his earlier prototype. He made modifications to Hermann von Helmholtz's ophthalmoscope by implementing a concave focusing mirror, and thereby introduced "indirect ophthalmoscopy" to allow for a stereoscopic and wider view of the fundus of the eye. Ruete also conducted extensive research of ophthalmic disorders that included strabismus and hypermetropia.

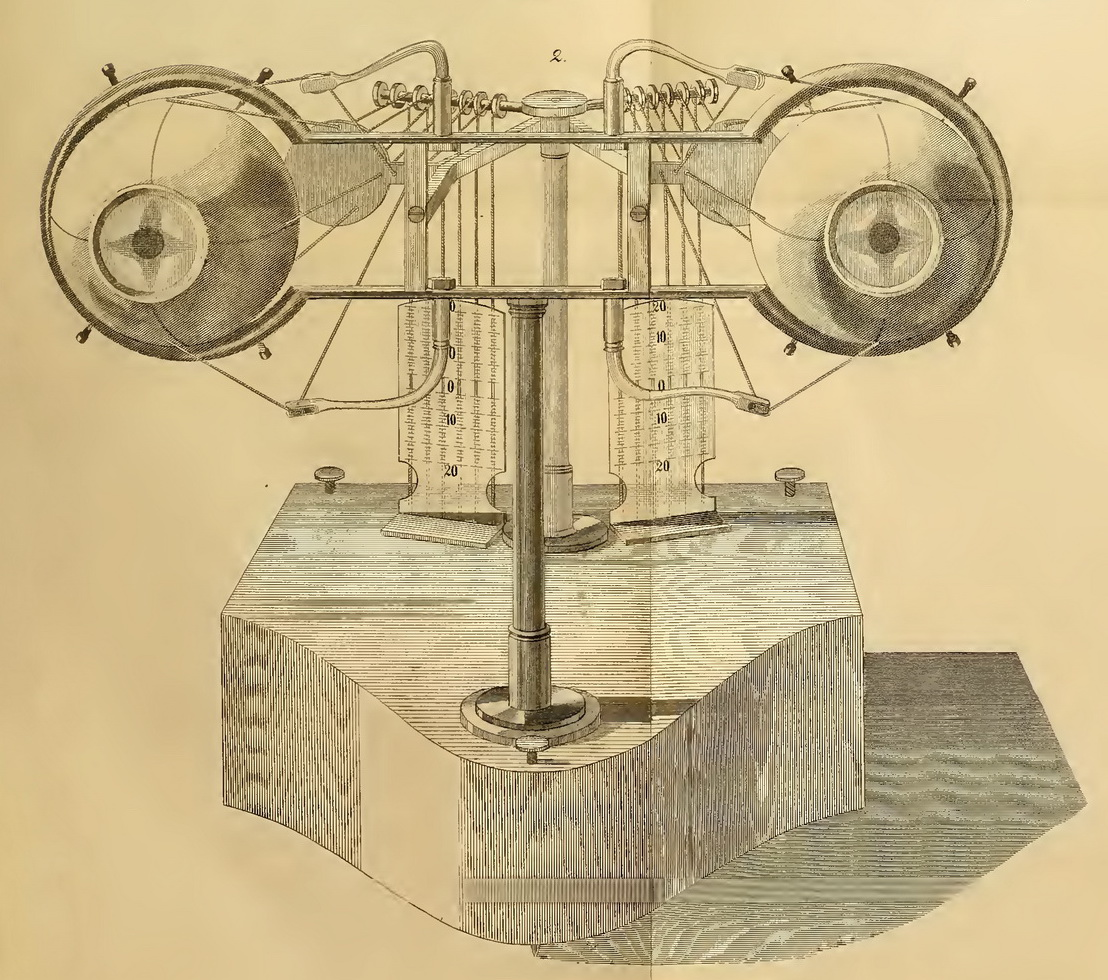
Ruete's ophthalmotrope, second model (1857)

== Written works ==
In 1845 Ruete published "Lehrbuch der Ophthalmologie für Aerzte und Studirende", a book that contained the first depiction of a visual migraine aura in European medical literature. In the book, he pictorially explained the phenomenon in three successive stages. With mathematician Johann Benedict Listing (1808–1882), he published a treatise on entoptic phenomena and cataract. Other noted publications by Ruete include:

- Die Scrophelkrankheit, insbesondere die scrophulöse Augenentzündung. Göttingen: Dieterich, 1838. – Book on phlyctenular conjunctivitis.
- Das Ophthalmotrop, 1846 – The ophthalmotrope.
- Der Augenspiegel und das Optometer für practische Aerzte, 1852 – The ophthalmoscope and the optometer for physicians.
- Bildliche Darstellung der Krankheiten des menschlichen Auges. Leipzig: B.G. Teubner, 1854–60. – Book on eye diseases, therapeutics and ocular surgery.
- Ein neues Ophthalmotrop, 1857 – A new ophthalmotrope.
- Das Stereoscop : eine populäre Darstellung, 1860 – The stereoscope: a popular account.
