= Franciscus Donders =

Dutch ophthalmologist (1818–1889)

Franciscus Cornelis Donders
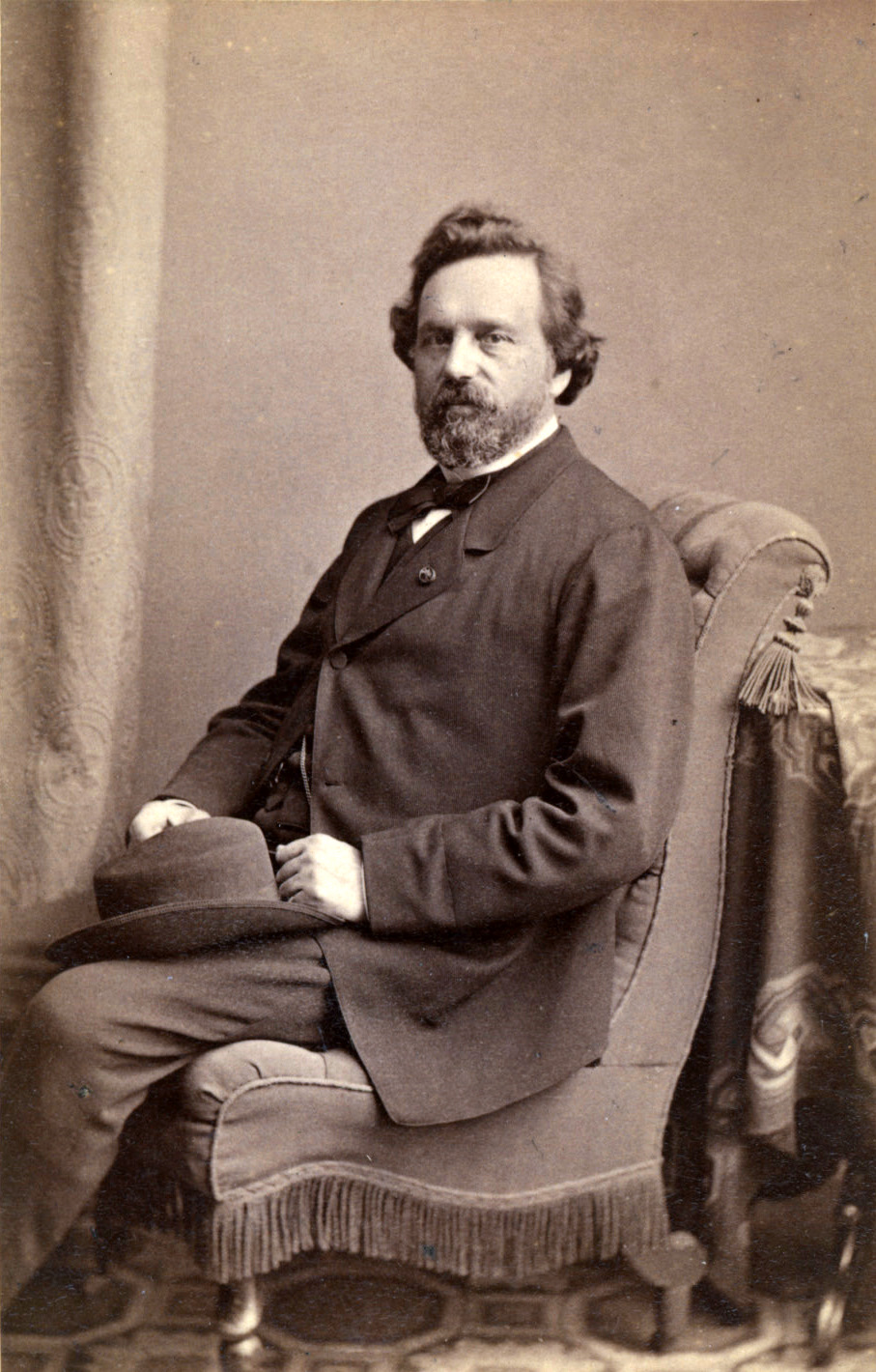
- Franciscus Cornelis Donders
- Born: 27 May 1818; Tilburg, Netherlands
- Died: 24 March 1889 (aged 70); Utrecht, Netherlands
- Known for: Eye disease, Reaction time, Donders' law; The Harmony of Animal Life, the Revelation of Laws (inaugural lecture), in which the theory of descent was concisely formulated
- Scientific career
- Fields: Ophthalmology
- Workplaces: Utrecht University

Franciscus (Frans) Cornelis Donders FRS FRSE (27 May 1818 – 24 March 1889) was a Dutch ophthalmologist. During his career, he was a professor of physiology in Utrecht, and was internationally regarded as an authority on eye diseases, directing the Netherlands Hospital for Eye Patients. Along with Graefe and Helmholtz, he was one of the primary founders of scientific ophthalmology.

== Life ==
He was born in Tilburg, the son of Jan Franz Donders and Agnes Elizabeth Hegh.

=== Education ===
Franciscus Donders was first educated at Duizel School and seminaries in both Tilburg and Boxmeer.

By the age of seventeen, he had started studying medicine in the School of Military in Utrecht. It was here that he discovered his passion for experimental study, specifically in the field of chemistry. By the age of twenty-two he entered the junior military in order to become a surgeon For several years, the young Donders studied at the Royal Dutch Hospital for Military Medicine in Utrecht, then earning his M.D. in 1840 from the University of Leiden.

Following a stint as a medical officer in the Hague, in 1842 he was appointed as a lecturer in physiology and anatomy at the Utrecht military medical school. Because of his accomplishments in his studies, he made good connections that would allow for him to study his own scientific work. Soon after doing that he became a Professor for Anatomy and Physiology in 1847 at Utrecht University. In 1847, he became an associate professor at Utrecht University and, in 1862, attained a full professorship in physiology. In 1847, he became correspondent of the Royal Institute of the Netherlands, when that became the Royal Netherlands Academy of Arts and Sciences; in 1851, he joined as member.

In 1848, eleven years before Charles Darwin's monumental Origin of Species was published, Donders delivered his inaugural lecture titled 'The Harmony of Animal Life, the Revelation of Laws'. In it, the entire theory of descent was already concisely formulated. In 1869, the two shook hands for the first time. In a letter to Donders from March 1871, Darwin writes: 'It is clear to me that you were as near as possible in preceding me on the subject of Natural Selection. You will find very little that is new to you in my last book (...)'.

Donders knew that textbook knowledge had a lot to offer the field of cognition, but he also knew that it would be enhanced and hold more validity if experiments were involved.

=== Research and findings ===
Donders, being a physiologist, is particularly known for his work and research of eye disease and was among the first practitioners of the ophthalmoscope. He is credited with invention of an impression tonometer (1862), and for introduction of prismatic and cylindrical lenses for treatment of astigmatism (1860).

Donders was the first to show that a measurable amount of time is needed for an abstract mental process to occur in humans. His work built upon previous work by Helmholtz, who measured the time between stimulating a nerve and muscle retraction in frogs. He was the first to use differences in human reaction time to infer differences in cognitive processing. He tested both simple reaction time and choice reaction time, finding that simple reaction was faster. This concept is now one of the central tenets of cognitive psychology – while mental chronometry is not a topic in itself, it is one of the most common tools used for making inferences about processes such as learning, memory, and attention. He performed the experiments beginning in 1865, and reported them in 1868.

Using reaction time, Donders constructed what is known as reaction time, and three distinct ways to analyze it. The common version was task A (simple). When Donders's conducted task A, he stimulated the participant's foot in order to measure the fastest hand reaction. Participants were made known ahead of time that they would be measuring how fast the response of their hand was (which enabled them to better sense the stimulation). Donder's task B (choice) consisted of stimulation in the right hand and measuring the response of the right foot. This task had the same goals as task A; On top of that the subject's ability to discriminate the stimulus and point out the stimulus was also measured and requires the intervention of a response decision. The third distinct task was known as the C task (Go/No-go task) To analyze this task Donder stimulated the both feet of participants. Participants were asked to respond with their right hand when they felt stimulation in the right foot, but not to do the same with the left side. This task was also designed to measure the participants ability to detect stimuli and offer the requested response. Donders's task C cannot be performed without intervention of stimulus discrimination occurring within the sensory and motor process.

He represents the durations of these processes labeling them as a-, b- and c- methods (example a/-a = eat/don't eat) In order to utilize these methods Donders used the speech repetition task. In method a, the subject is told what syllable to repeat, and must repeat it back as fast as possible after hearing the experimenter say it. In method b, the subject is told of 5 possible syllables, and must repeat back whichever the experimenter says. In method c, the subject is told of 5 possible syllables, but also told that one syllable is special. The subject must repeat back only the special syllable. Different patterns were used for different methods. Donders reported that it takes 0.047 s more time for method c than method a (the discrimination duration), and that it takes 0.036 s more time for method b than method c (the choice duration). When learning to measure the speed of thought, Franciscus Donders was not keen of using electromagnetism to measure. He claimed that as the intensity changed, so would the results. Instead he looked at devices such as the phonautograph to graph out the speed of human speech.

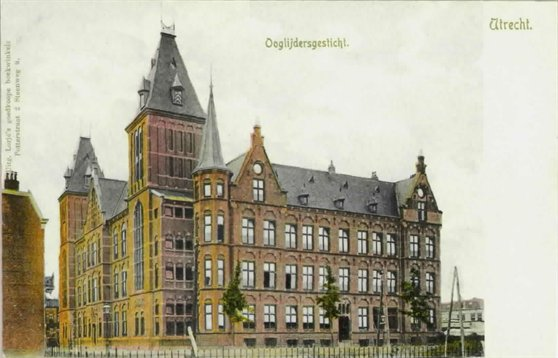
The hospital for eye-patients around 1904

Donders founded the Nederlands Gasthuis voor Behoeftige en Minvermogende Ooglijders (in short: Ooglijdersgasthuis) – the Netherlands Hospital for Necessitous Eye-Patients in 1858. His first associate was Herman Snellen. In 1864, he published the highly acclaimed "On the anomalies of accommodation and refraction of the eye". This book was written in 1864 and focused on separated errors of refraction and accommodation. The publication of this book enabled the vending of eye glass fittings to be the service of ophthalmology.

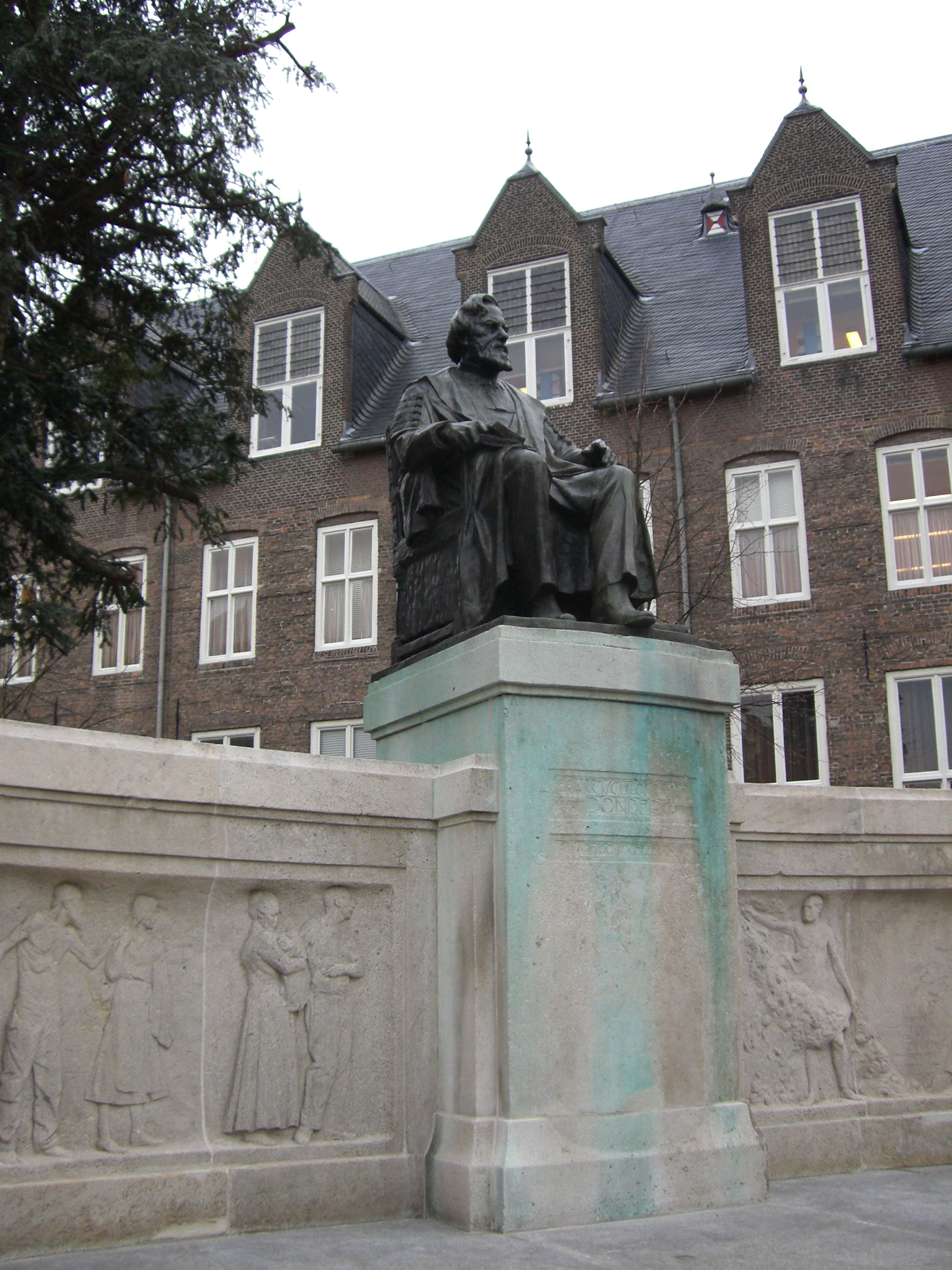
Statue of F. C. Donders in Utrecht

Franciscus Donders spent a lot of time studying and researching biology and cognition. Only a little amount of his time was spent studying ophthalmology. Although little, its impact was the parent of many concepts (that still exist) in the field of ophthalmology. He introduced subjects such as refraction, astigmatism, accommodation, ametropia, hypermetropia, aphakia, presbyopia, convergence, and quint. He is also responsible for the formula that equates the sharpness of one's vision. It was in 1864 when Donders's was able to introduce accommodation of the Eye, and refraction. Donders taught that the retina uses rays in order to come together. This occurs behind the retina and is what allows us to perceive nearby objects. Once those rays have been perceived they are then able to bring more rays into the retina. This is known as the power of accommodation of the eye. This was significant because it created what is now known as scientific Ophthalmology. Of the concepts he introduced, the most important is Donders's Law, which states that "the rotation of the eyeball is determined by the distance of the object from the median plane and the line of the horizon". It contains 3 specific dimensions that orientate the eye for whichever way it looks. It also states that the orientation of the eye has no correlation with the starting point. If the eye is constantly looking at the same thing, the orientation of the eye will also remain the same. The law assures that the eye focuses on far away targets (with an upright head) and adapts to a special angle for each glaze that occurs; even though there are numerous ways eyes could position. Other contributions to the field of ophthalmology include: the translation of German textbooks to Dutch, the clinical application within the field, acknowledgment of glaucoma and its subtypes, analysis of brain function, and the reduced eye model.

Donders is also well recognized in the dental community for naming the "space of Donders", the space between the dorsum of the tongue and the hard palate when the mandible is at rest.

=== Personal life ===
Donders married twice: first in 1845 to Ernestine Zimmerman (d.1887); secondly, in 1888 to Abrahamine Arnolda Louisa Hubrecht.

He died in Utrecht at the age of seventy.

== Names ==
At least ten cities in the Netherlands have streets that bare his name; F.C. Dondersstraat. At Radboud University in Nijmegen the Donders Institute consists of four centres, including the Centre for Cognitive Neuroimaging, all named after him. In his hometown Tilburg Franciscus Donders is considered to be the most famous resident.
